= Economy of India =

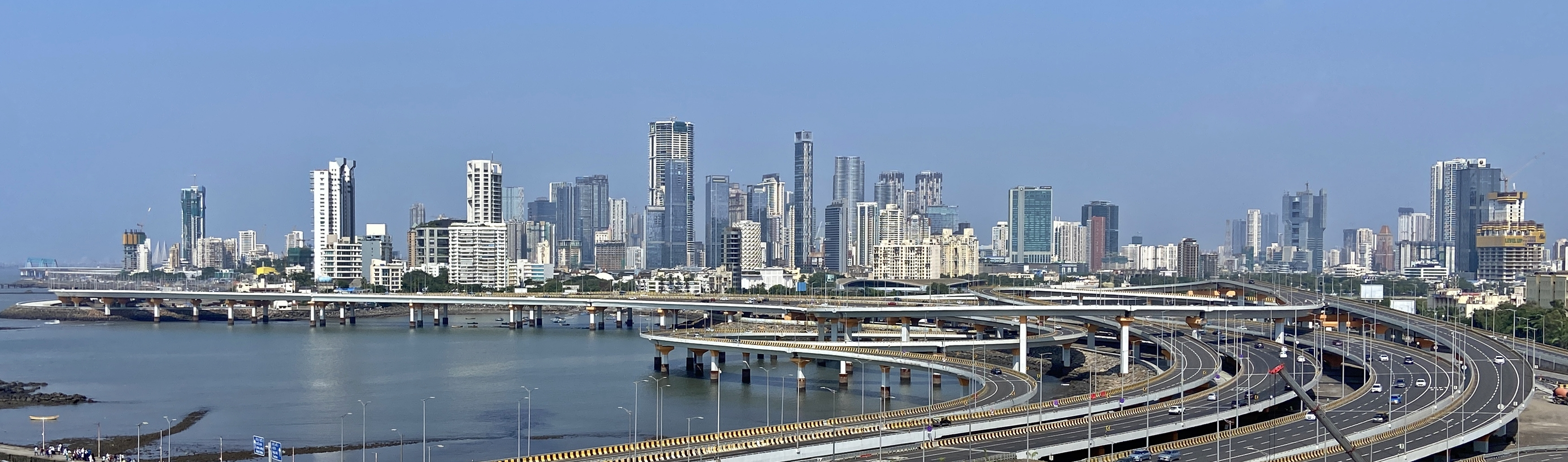
- Mumbai, the financial capital of India
- Currency: Indian rupee (INR, ₹)
- Fiscal year: 1 April – 31 March
- Trade organisations: WTO, WCO, SAFTA, BIMSTEC, BRICS, G-20, BIS, AIIB, ADB and others
- Country group: Developing country; Lower-middle income economy; Newly industrialized country

Statistics
- Population: ▲1,428,627,663 (1st; 2024 est.)
- GDP: ▲$4.06 trillion (nominal; 2026); ▲$19.19 trillion (PPP; 2026)
- GDP rank: 6th (nominal; 2026); 3rd (PPP; 2026)
- GDP growth: ▲7.6% (2025); ▼7.0% (2026, projected); 7.0% (2027, projected)
- GDP per capita: ▲$2,749 (nominal; 2026); ▲$12,998 (PPP; 2026)
- GDP per capita rank: 151st (nominal; 2026); 122nd (PPP; 2026)
- GDP per capita growth: ▲7% (2026)
- GDP by sector: Agriculture: 17.7%; Industry: 27.6%; Services: 54.7%; (FY 2023–24)
- GDP by component: Private final consumption: 56.3%; Government final consumption: 9.3%; Gross fixed capital formation: 33.5%; Exports of goods and services: 22.6%; Imports of goods and services: -23.2%; Other source: 2.5%; (FY 2024–25)
- Inflation (CPI): ▲3.48% (March 2026)
- Population below national poverty line: ▼16.1% (2023); ▼2.6% living in extreme poverty (2023)
- Gini coefficient: 25.5 low (2025)
- Human Development Index: ▲0.685 medium (2023, HDI 130th); ▲0.475 low (2023, IHDI 120th)
- Corruption Perceptions Index: ▼38 out of 100 points (2024) (rank 96th)
- Labour force: ▲ ~610 million (2025) ▲42.1% employment rate
- Labour force by occupation: Infrastructure: 13%; Agriculture: 44%; Industry: 28%; Services: 34%; (2023)
- Unemployment: ▼4.9% (March 2025)
- Youth unemployment: ▲13.4% (2025)
- Informal employment: 87.2% (2025)
- Final consumption expenditure: ▼70.7% of GDP (2023)
- Gross capital formation: ▲31% of GDP (2023)
- Gross savings: 31.781% of GDP (2023)
- Yield curve: 10-year bond 7.190% (Jan 2023)
- Purchasing Managers' Index: ▲55.0 Manufacturing (May 2026); ▲58.8 Services (April 2026)
- Main industries: Mining and ore processing (including Coal, Iron ore, Aluminium and other metals); Steel and other base metals; Petrochemicals; Cement; capital goods and heavy machinery; infrastructure; transportation equipment (including Automobiles and EV components); electronics and semiconductors; consumer electronics and home appliances; textiles and apparel; software and IT; financial technology and Artificial intelligence; agribusiness and food processing; pharmaceuticals and biotechnology; medical devices; renewable energy; defense manufacturing; aerospace and space technology (satellites, launch vehicles)

External
- Exports: ▲$860.09 billion (FY 2025–26)
- Export goods: Manufacturers 70.7%; Fuels and mining products 14.7%; Agricultural products 14.1%; Others 0.5% (2022)
- Main export partners: United States 19.8%; European Union 16.4%; United Arab Emirates 8.5%; China 6.2%; Hong Kong 1.8%; United Kingdom 3.1%; Singapore 2.7%; Bangladesh 2.4%; Saudi Arabia 2.3%; Nepal 1.7%; Australia 1.7%; (2025–26)
- Imports: ▲$979.40 billion (FY 2025–26)
- Import goods: Agricultural products 7%; Fuels and mining products 33.2%; Manufacturers 52.1%; Other 7.7 % (2022)
- Main import partners: China 20.1%; Hong Kong 3.1%; European Union 8.5%; United Arab Emirates 8.2%; Russia 7.1%; United States 6.9%; Saudi Arabia 4.0%; Iraq 3.2%; Switzerland 3.1%; Singapore 3.1%; Japan 2.8%; (2025–26)
- FDI stock: ▲ Inward: $94.53 billion (2025–26)
- Current account: ▲ –$44.563 billion (2024); ▲ –1.146% of GDP (2024)
- Gross external debt: ▲$762.8 billion (March 2026); (▼20.8% of GDP)
- Net international investment position: ▼ –$379.7 billion (June 2023)

Public finance
- Government debt: ▼₹320.782 trillion (US$3.4 trillion); ▼80.4% of GDP (2025)
- Foreign reserves: ▲$785.706 billion (4th) (as of 21 August 2026)
- Budget balance: –6.4% of GDP (2022–23)
- Revenue: ₹34.96 trillion (US$370 billion); (2025–26)
- Spending: ₹50.65 trillion (US$540 billion); (2025–26)
- Economic aid: Donor: ▲$4.234 billion (2021) ($30.59 billion Line of Credit in total)
- Credit rating: Standard & Poor's: BBB; Outlook: Stable; Moody's: Baa3; Outlook: Stable; Fitch: BBB−; Outlook: Stable; DBRS: BBB; Outlook: Stable; Japan Credit Rating Agency: A-; Outlook: Stable
- All values, unless otherwise stated, are in US dollars.

India has a developing market-oriented economy with substantial state participation in strategic sectors. It is the world's sixth-largest economy by nominal GDP and the third-largest by purchasing power parity (PPP) as of April 2026. On a per capita income basis, the nation is ranked 149th by nominal GDP and 119th by PPP-adjusted GDP as of 2026. From independence in 1947 until 1991, economic development was characterized by protectionist economic policies, with extensive state intervention, demand-side economics, natural resource optimization, and regulation. An acute balance of payments crisis in 1991 led to the adoption of broad economic liberalisation in India and indicative planning.

Nearly 70% of India's GDP is driven by domestic consumption, with the nation consistently the world's third-largest consumer market. As of 2025, the service sector accounts for around 55% of GDP. Aside from private consumption, India's GDP is fueled by government spending, investments, and exports. As of 2025, India is the world's 7th-largest importer and the 10th-largest exporter. India is often described as the "pharmacy of the world", supplying around one-fifth of global demand for pharmaceuticals to over 200 countries. India is the largest vaccine manufacturer globally by volume, accounting for over 60% of the world's production. India is the world's fifth-largest manufacturer, representing 3.2% of global manufacturing output. India's digital economy was estimated to be 11.7% of GDP, with its total value expected to surpass US$1 trillion by 2029. Nearly 63% of India's population lives in rural areas, and generates about 46% of Indian GDP.

India has been a member of the World Trade Organization (WTO) since 1995. It ranks 41st on the Global Competitiveness Index and 39th in the Global Innovation Index. As of 2025, India ranks third in the world in total number of billionaires. India's Gini coefficient fell to 25.5 by 2023, making it the fourth-most equal country globally, suggesting significant progress in income equality. Economists and social scientists often consider India a welfare state. India's overall social welfare spending stood at 8.6% of GDP in 2022. It has two of the world's ten largest stock exchanges. India has free-trade agreements with many world nations, including the European Union, and is a member of numerous economic organisations

== History ==
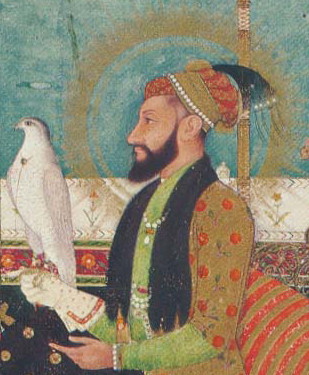
Aurangzeb expanded the Mughal Empire and made it the region with the largest GDP in the 17th century.

The Indus Valley Civilisation, the early civilisation of India and Pakistan, developed an economy based on agriculture and crafts that later spread into central India. Angus Maddison estimates that from 1-1000 AD, the regions that make up the present-day India contributed roughly 30% of the world's population and GDP.

India experienced per-capita GDP growth in the high medieval era. By the late 17th century, most of the Indian subcontinent had been united under the Mughal Emperor Aurangzeb; according to Maddison's estimates, the empire was for a time the largest economy and manufacturing power in the world, producing about a quarter of global GDP, before fragmenting and being conquered over the next century. After independence, India adopted a combination of protectionist, import-substitution policies, inspired by Fabian socialism and social democracy; the economy of this period was characterised as Dirigiste, with extensive regulation, protectionism, and public ownership of large monopolies. Since 1991, continuing economic liberalisation has moved the country towards a market-based economy. By 2008, India had become one of the world's fastest-growing economies.

=== Ancient and medieval eras ===
==== Indus Valley Civilisation ====
The citizens of the Indus Valley civilisation, a permanent settlement that flourished between 2800 BCE and 1800 BCE, practised agriculture, domesticated animals, used uniform weights and measures, made tools and weapons, and traded with other cities. Evidence of well-planned streets, a drainage system, and water supply reveals their knowledge of urban planning, which included the first-known urban sanitation systems and the existence of a form of municipal government.

==== West Coast ====
Maritime trade was carried out extensively between southern regions of India and Southeast Asia and West Asia from early times until around the fourteenth century CE. Both the Malabar and Coromandel Coasts were the sites of important trading centres from as early as the first century BCE, used for import and export as well as transit points between the Mediterranean region and southeast Asia. Over time, traders organised themselves into associations which received state patronage. This state patronage for overseas trade came to an end by the thirteenth century CE, when it was largely taken over by the local Parsi, Jewish, Syrian Christian, and Muslim communities, initially on the Malabar and subsequently on the Coromandel coast.

==== Silk Route ====
Some historians suggest trading from India to West Asia and Eastern Europe was active between the 14th and 18th centuries. During this period, Indian traders settled in Surakhani, a suburb of greater Baku, Azerbaijan. These traders built a Hindu temple, which suggests commerce was active and prosperous for Indians by the 17th century.

Further north, the Saurashtra and Bengal coasts played an important role in maritime trade, and the Gangetic plains and the Indus valley housed several centres of river-borne commerce. Most overland trade was carried out via the Khyber Pass connecting the Punjab region with Afghanistan and onward to the Middle East and Central Asia. Although many kingdoms and rulers issued coins, barter was prevalent. Villages paid a portion of their agricultural produce as revenue to the rulers, while their craftsmen received a part of the crops at harvest time for their services.

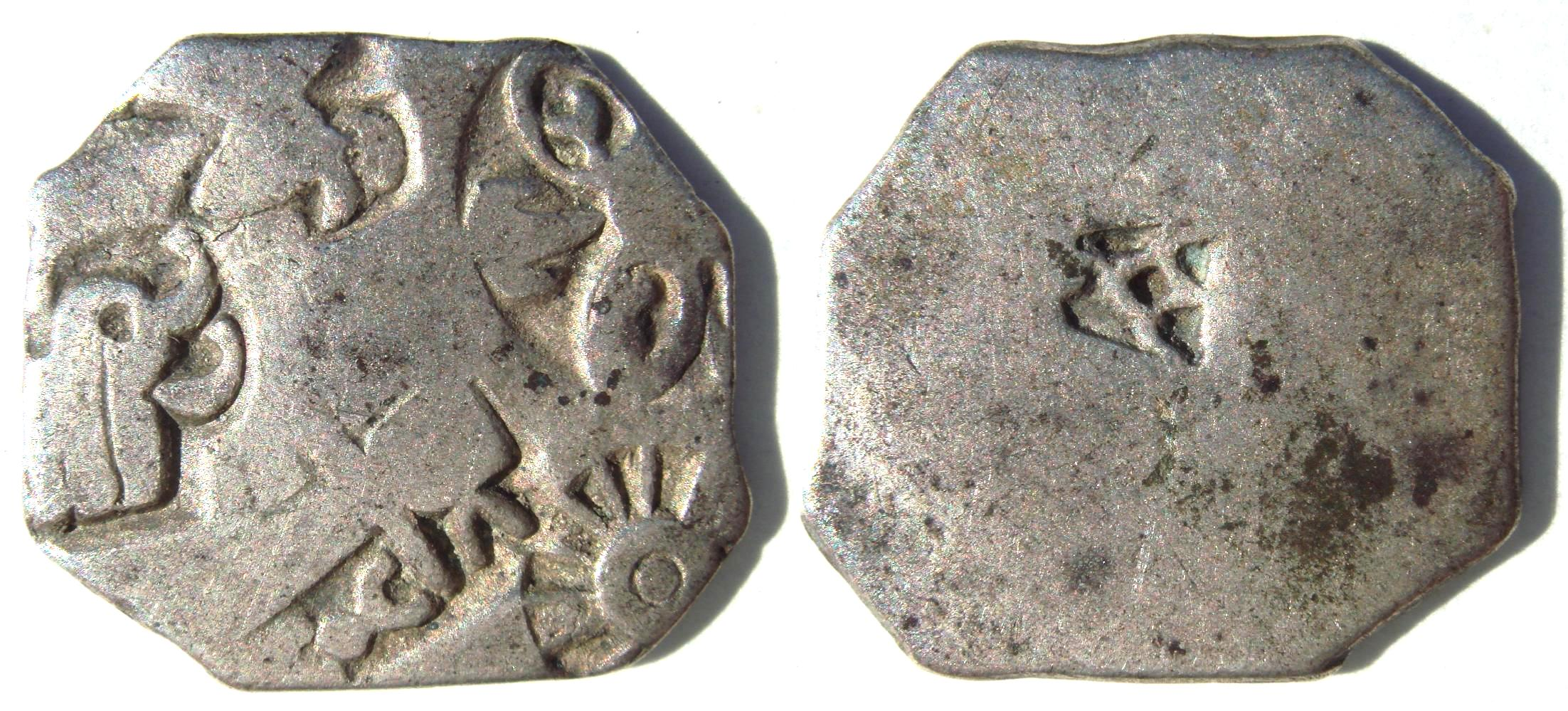
Silver coin of the Maurya Empire, 3rd century BCE

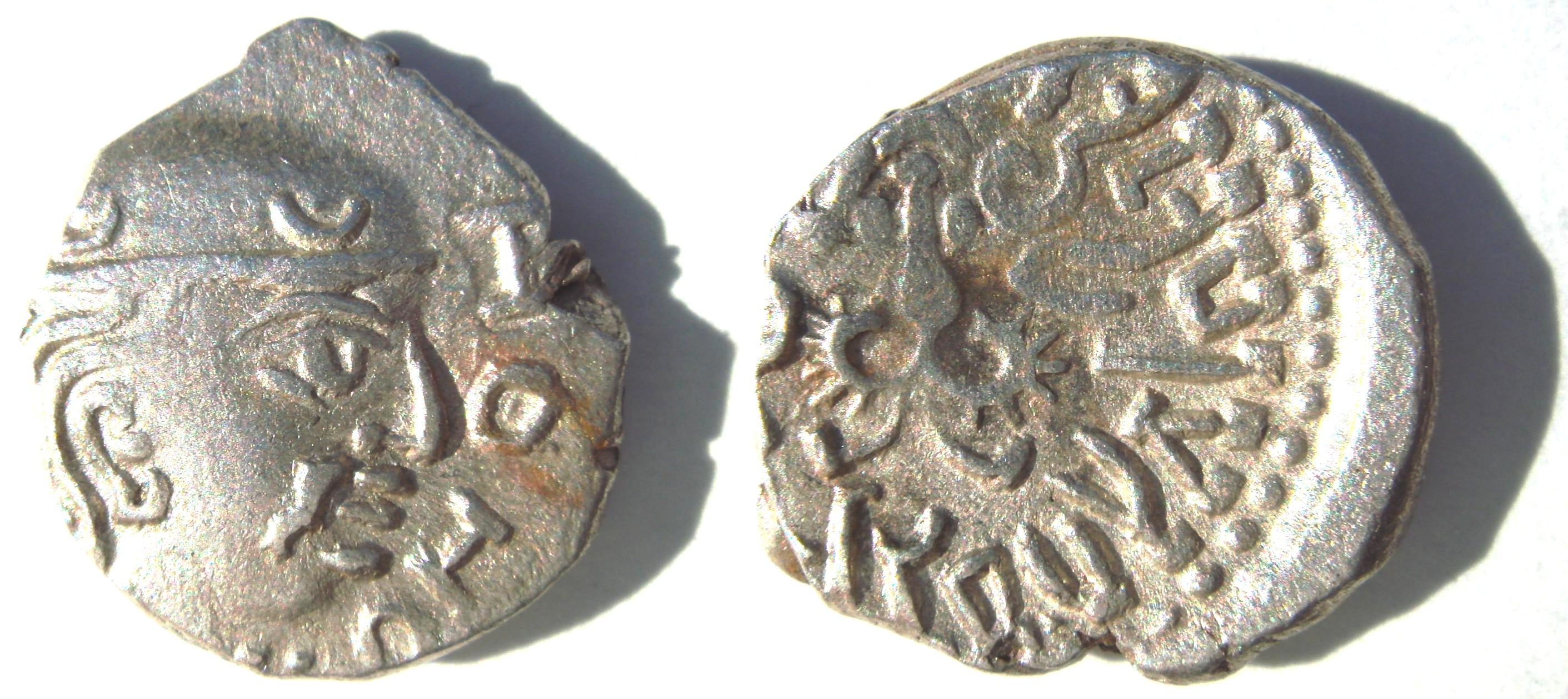
Silver coin of the Gupta dynasty, 5th century CE

=== Mughal, Rajput, and Maratha eras (1526–1820) ===
According to Angus Maddison's estimates, the economy of the Indian subcontinent was the largest for most of recorded history. Sean Harkin estimates that China and India may have accounted for 60 to 70 percent of world GDP in the 17th century. The Mughal economy functioned on an elaborate system of coined currency, land revenue and trade. Gold, silver and copper coins were issued by the royal mints which functioned on the basis of free coinage. The political stability and uniform revenue policy resulting from a centralized administration under the Mughals, coupled with a well-developed internal trade network, ensured that India–before the arrival of the British–was to a large extent economically unified, despite having a traditional agrarian economy characterised by a predominance of subsistence agriculture. Agricultural production increased under Mughal agrarian reforms, with Indian agriculture being advanced compared to Europe at the time, such as the widespread use of the seed drill among Indian peasants before its adoption in European agriculture, and possibly higher per-capita agricultural output and standards of consumption than 17th century Europe. The state's land-revenue demand was heavy: Irfan Habib estimates that the real demand amounted to "half the produce" as the standard in several regions.

The Mughal Empire had a thriving industrial manufacturing economy, with India producing about 25% of the world's industrial output up until 1750, making it the most important manufacturing centre in international trade. Manufactured goods and cash crops from the Mughal Empire were sold throughout the world. Key industries included textiles, shipbuilding, and steel, and processed exports included cotton textiles, yarns, thread, silk, jute products, metalware, and foods such as sugar, oils and butter. Cities and towns boomed under the Mughal Empire, which had a relatively high degree of urbanization for its time, with 15% of its population living in urban centres, higher than the percentage of the urban population in contemporary Europe at the time and higher than that of British India in the 19th century.

In early modern Europe, there was significant demand for products from Mughal India, particularly cotton textiles, as well as goods such as spices, peppers, indigo, silks, and saltpeter (for use in munitions). European fashion, for example, became increasingly dependent on Mughal Indian textiles and silks. From the late 17th century to the early 18th century, Mughal India accounted for 95% of British imports from Asia, and the Bengal Subah province alone accounted for 40% of Dutch imports from Asia. In contrast, there was very little demand for European goods in Mughal India, which was largely self-sufficient. Indian goods, especially those from Bengal, were also exported in large quantities to other Asian markets, such as Indonesia and Japan. At the time, Mughal Bengal was the most important centre of cotton textile production.

In the early 18th century the Mughal Empire declined, as it lost western, central and parts of south and north India to the Maratha Empire, which integrated and continued to administer those regions. The decline of the Mughal Empire led to decreased agricultural productivity, which in turn negatively affected the textile industry. The subcontinent's dominant economic power in the post-Mughal era was the Bengal Subah in the east., which continued to maintain thriving textile industries and relatively high real wages. However, the former was devastated by the Maratha invasions of Bengal and then British colonization in the mid-18th century. After the loss at the Third Battle of Panipat, the Maratha Empire disintegrated into several confederate states, and the resulting political instability and armed conflict severely affected economic life in several parts of the country – although this was mitigated by localised prosperity in the new provincial kingdoms. By the late eighteenth century, the British East India Company had entered the Indian political theatre and established its dominance over other European powers. This marked a determinative shift in India's trade, and a less-powerful effect on the rest of the economy.

=== British era (1793–1947) ===
There is no doubt that our grievances against the British Empire had a sound basis. As the painstaking statistical work of the Cambridge historian Angus Maddison has shown, India's share of world income collapsed from 22.6% in 1700, almost equal to Europe's share of 23.3% at that time, to as low as 3.8% in 1952. Indeed, at the beginning of the 20th century, "the brightest jewel in the British Crown" was the poorest country in the world in terms of per capita income.

— Manmohan Singh

From the beginning of the 19th century, the British East India Company's gradual expansion and consolidation of power brought a major change in taxation and agricultural policies, which tended to promote commercialisation of agriculture with a focus on trade, resulting in decreased production of food crops, mass impoverishment and destitution of farmers, and in the short term, led to numerous famines. The economic policies of the British Raj caused a severe decline in the handicrafts and handloom sectors, due to reduced demand and dipping employment. After the removal of international restrictions by the Charter of 1813, Indian trade expanded substantially with steady growth. The result was a significant transfer of capital from India to Britain, which, due to the colonial policies of the British, led to a massive drain of revenue rather than any systematic effort at modernisation of the domestic economy. The economy of the Indian subcontinent was the largest in the world for most of recorded history up until the onset of colonialism in the early 19th century.

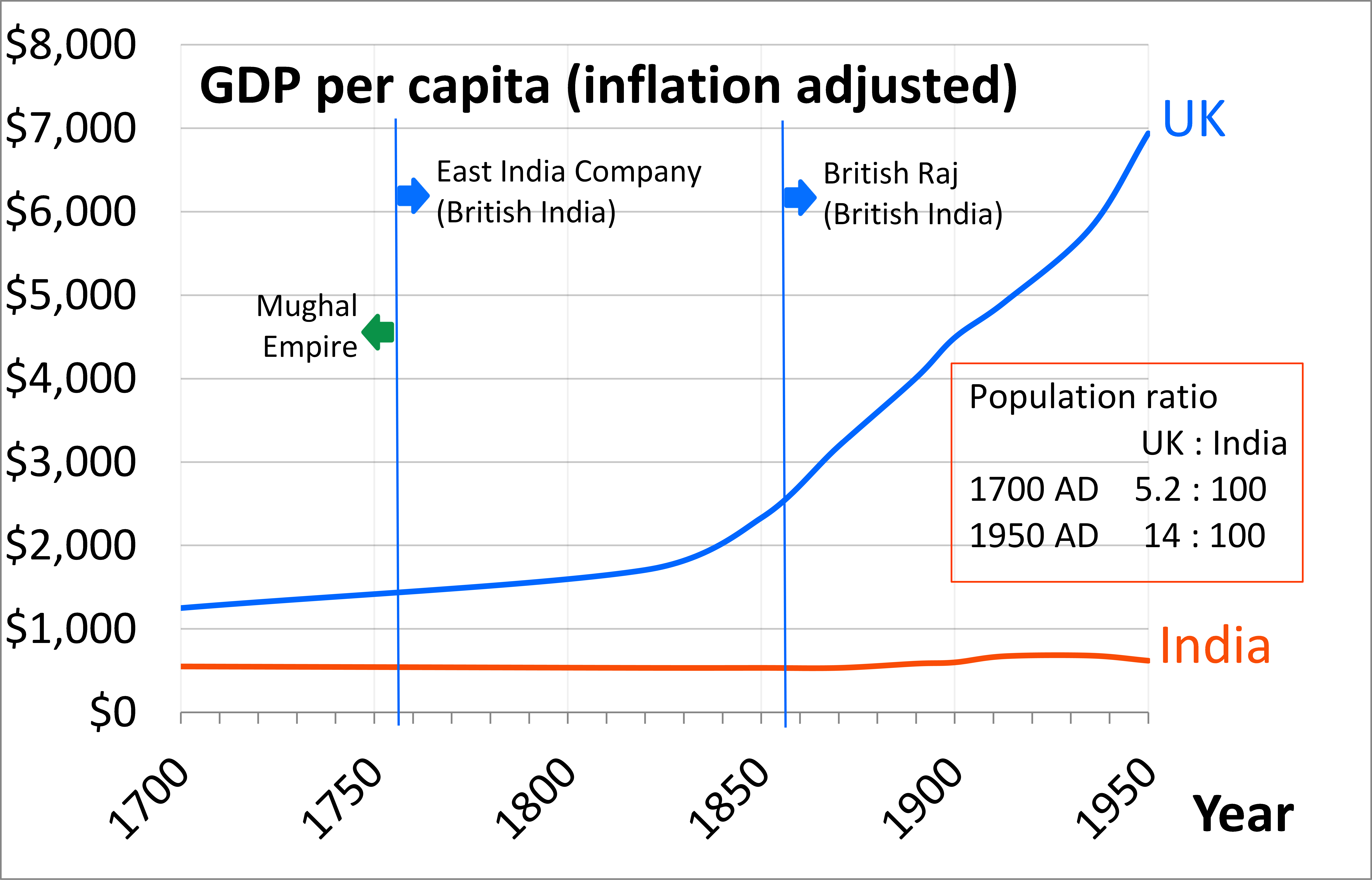
Estimated GDP per capita of India and United Kingdom during 1700–1950 in 1990 US$ according to Maddison. Maddison's estimates for 18th-century India have been criticized as gross underestimates, Bairoch estimates India had a higher GDP per capita in the 18th century, and Parthasarathi's findings show higher real wages in 18th-century Bengal and Mysore. There is consensus that India's per capita GDP and income stagnated during the colonial era, starting in the late 18th century.

Under British rule, India's share of the world economy declined from 24.4% in 1700 down to 4.2% in 1950. India's GDP (PPP) per capita was stagnant during the Mughal Empire and began to decline prior to the onset of British rule. India's share of global industrial output declined from 25% in 1750 down to 2% in 1900. At the same time, Britain's share of the world economy rose from 2.9% in 1700 up to 9% in 1870. The British East India Company, following their conquest of Bengal in 1757, had forced open the large Indian market to British goods, which could be sold in India without tariffs or duties, compared to local Indian producers who were heavily taxed, while in Britain protectionist policies such as bans and high tariffs were implemented to restrict Indian textiles from being sold there, whereas raw cotton was imported from India without tariffs to British factories which manufactured textiles from Indian cotton and sold them back to the Indian market. British economic policies gave them a monopoly over India's large market and cotton resources. India served as both a significant supplier of raw goods to British manufacturers and a large captive market for British manufactured goods.

British territorial expansion in India throughout the 19th century created an institutional environment that, on paper, guaranteed property rights among the colonisers, encouraged free trade, and created a single currency with fixed exchange rates, standardised weights and measures and capital markets within the company-held territories. It also established a system of railways and telegraphs, a civil service that aimed to be free from political interference, a common-law, and an adversarial legal system. This coincided with major changes in the world economy – industrialisation, and significant growth in production and trade. However, at the end of colonial rule, India inherited an economy that was one of the poorest in the developing world, with industrial development stalled, agriculture unable to feed a rapidly growing population, a largely illiterate and unskilled labour force, and extremely inadequate infrastructure.

The 1872 census revealed that 91.3% of the population of the region constituting present-day India resided in villages. This was a decline from the earlier Mughal era, when 85% of the population resided in villages and 15% in urban centres under Akbar's reign in 1600. Urbanisation generally remained sluggish in British India until the 1920s, due to the lack of industrialisation and absence of adequate transportation. Subsequently, the policy of discriminating protection (where certain important industries were given financial protection by the state), coupled with the Second World War, saw the development and dispersal of industries, encouraging rural-urban migration, and in particular, the large port cities of Bombay, Calcutta and Madras grew rapidly. Despite this, only one-sixth of India's population lived in cities by 1951.

The effect of British rule on India's economy is a controversial topic. Leaders of the Indian independence movement and economic historians have blamed colonial rule for India's poor economic performance following independence and argued that the capital required for the Industrial Revolution in Britain came from India. At the same time, other historians have countered that India's poor economic performance was due to various sectors being in a state of growth and decline due to changes brought in by colonialism and a world that was moving towards industrialisation and economic integration.

Several economic historians have argued that Indian real wages declined in the early 19th century, or possibly beginning in the very late 18th century, largely as a result of British colonial rule. According to Prasannan Parthasarathi and Sashi Sivramkrishna, the grain wages of Indian weavers were likely comparable to that of their British counterparts and their average income was around five times the subsistence level, which was comparable to advanced parts of Europe. However they concluded that due to the scarcity of data, it was hard to draw definitive conclusions and that more research was required. It has also been argued that India went through a period of deindustrialization in the latter half of the 18th century as an indirect outcome of the collapse of the Mughal Empire.

=== Pre-liberalisation period (1947–1980) ===
Indian economic policy after independence was influenced by the impact of the colonial experience, which was seen as exploitative by Indian leaders. Domestic policy tended towards protectionism, with a strong emphasis on import substitution industrialisation, economic interventionism, a large government-run public sector, business regulation, and central planning, while trade and foreign investment policies were relatively liberal. Five-Year Plans of India resembled central planning in the Soviet Union. Steel, mining, machine tools, telecommunications, insurance, and power plants, among other industries, were effectively nationalised in the mid-1950s. The Indian economy of this period is characterised as Dirigism.

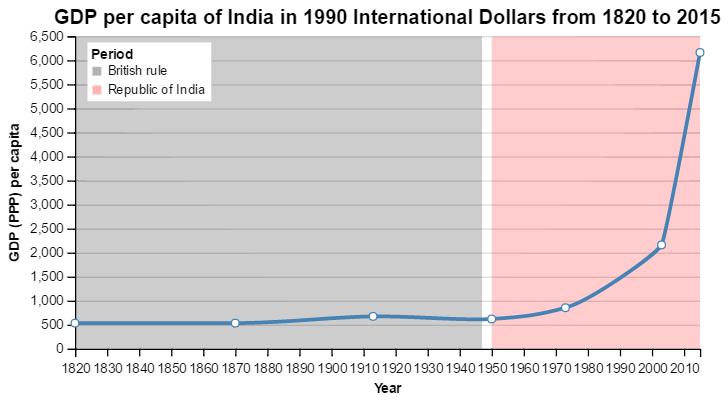
Change in per capita GDP of India, 1820–2015. Figures are inflation-adjusted to 1990 International Geary-Khamis dollars.

Never talk to me about profit, Jeh, it is a dirty word.

— Nehru, India's Fabian Socialism-inspired first prime minister to industrialist J. R. D. Tata, when Tata suggested state-owned companies should be profitable

Jawaharlal Nehru, the first prime minister of India, along with the statistician Prasanta Chandra Mahalanobis, formulated and oversaw economic policy during the initial years of the country's independence. They expected favourable outcomes from their strategy, involving the rapid development of heavy industry by both public and private sectors, and based on direct and indirect state intervention, rather than the more extreme Soviet-style central command system. The Avadi Resolution, in January 1955, declared that the objective of the Indian National Congress was the establishment of a "socialistic pattern of society" in India. The policy of concentrating simultaneously on capital- and technology-intensive heavy industry and subsidising manual, low-skill cottage industries was criticised by economist Milton Friedman, who thought it would waste capital and labour, and retard the development of small manufacturers. A more sustained domestic criticism came from the economist BR Shenoy, a former student of Frederich Hayek at the London School of Economics. In 1955, Shenoy was the sole dissenter among the 21-member Panel of Economists convened to review the Second Five Year Plan, issuing a "Note of Dissent" that argued the plan's reliance on deficit financing and large-scale state-led industrialisation would generate chronic inflation and balance of payment pressure rather than sustained growth. Consumer prices rose by roughly 30% over the course of the Plan, broadly as predicted by Shenoy. It is considered the first systemic critique of economic planning in India, and Shenoy is often cited in retrospect as anticipating the balance-of-payments crisis in 1991.

Domestic political opposition to economic planning came from the Swatantra Party, founded in 1959 by C Rajagopalachari, a former Governor-General of India, together with Minoo Masani and NG Ranga. The party was formed partly in reaction to the Avadi Resolution in 1955 in which Congress resolved to aim at a "socialistic pattern of society". Swatantra advocated a market-based economy, dismantaling of the "Licence Raj", free trade, and protection of private property rights. It became the single largest opposition party, with 44 seats, following the 1967 general election, before its decline after Rajaji's death in 1972, and dissolving in 1974.

I cannot decide how much to borrow, what shares to issue, at what price, what wages and bonus to pay, and what dividend to give. I even need the government's permission for the salary I pay to a senior executive.

— J. R. D. Tata, on the Indian regulatory system, 1969

Since 1965, the use of high-yielding varieties of seeds, increased fertilisers and improved irrigation facilities collectively contributed to the Green Revolution in India, which improved the condition of agriculture by increasing crop productivity, improving crop patterns and strengthening forward and backward linkages between agriculture and industry. However, it has also been criticised as an unsustainable effort, resulting in the growth of capitalistic farming, ignoring institutional reforms and widening income disparities.

=== Economic reforms during the 1980s ===
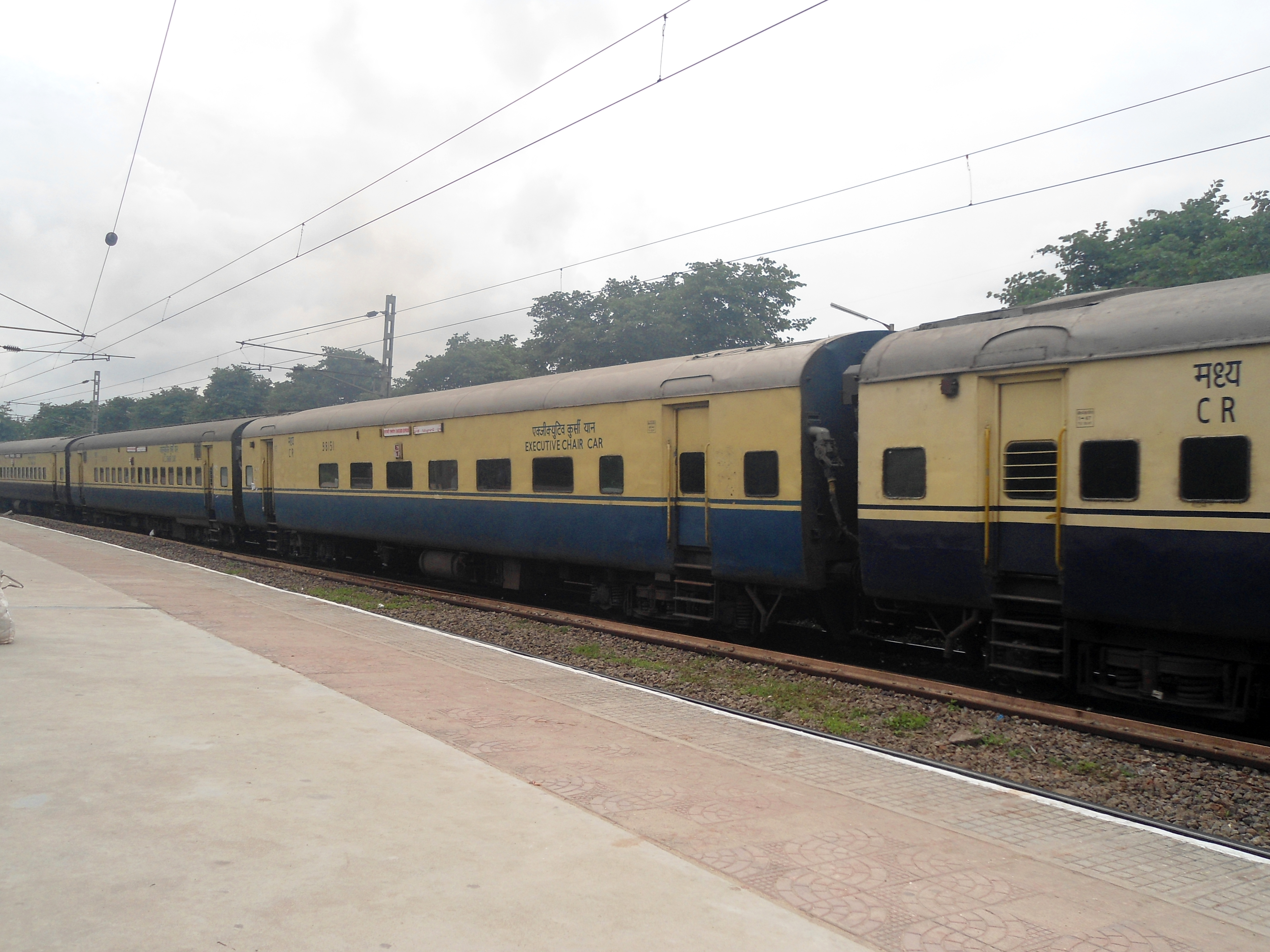
Shatabdi Express, operating since 1988 served as a model for newer trains of the Indian Railways

Indira Gandhi took several liberalization steps after the coming back to power following the 1980 Indian general election. There were several steps taken such as opening of automobile sectors to private sector i.e. Maruti Suzuki, creation of auto component industries through new industrial zones known as Industrial Model Townships(IMT) and Gurgaon, expansion of steel, fertilizer, oil and cement sector led to wider participation of private sector. They also subsequently tried to do urban reforms such as creation of Navi Mumbai and Noida.

In 1984, The New Computer Policy of 1984 was introduced by Rajiv Gandhi, as it eased import restrictions on technology, encouraged private investments, and provided incentives for software exports. This included computers, airlines, defense, and telecommunications. Gandhi's government also established Software Technology Parks (STPs) to provide infrastructure, tax benefits, and faster data communications, enabling companies to export software services globally. Rajiv Gandhi's administration also saw setup of new logistics, telecom and transport infrastructure like Nhava Sheva port, Centre for Development of Advanced Computing, Centre for Development of Telematics, CONCOR, IL&FS, CAMS and creation of highway body NHAI. These reforms led to the growth rate of 5.6% throughout 1980's instead of 2.9% in the 1970s but Soviet Union was the largest export partner to India, which would lead to 1991 crisis.

In 1990 Rajiv Gandhi introduced measures to significantly reduce the Licence Raj such as allowing private businesses and individuals to purchase capital, consumer goods and import without bureaucratic restrictions. Gandhi subsequently promised full economic liberalization and made V. P. Singh the finance minister, who tried to reduce tax evasion and tax receipts rose due to this crackdown although taxes were lowered. This process lost its momentum during the later tenure of Mr. Gandhi as his government was marred by scandals.

=== Post-liberalisation period (since 1991-2021) ===
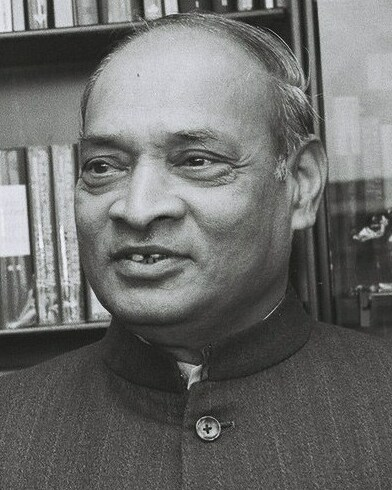
P. V. Narasimha Rao

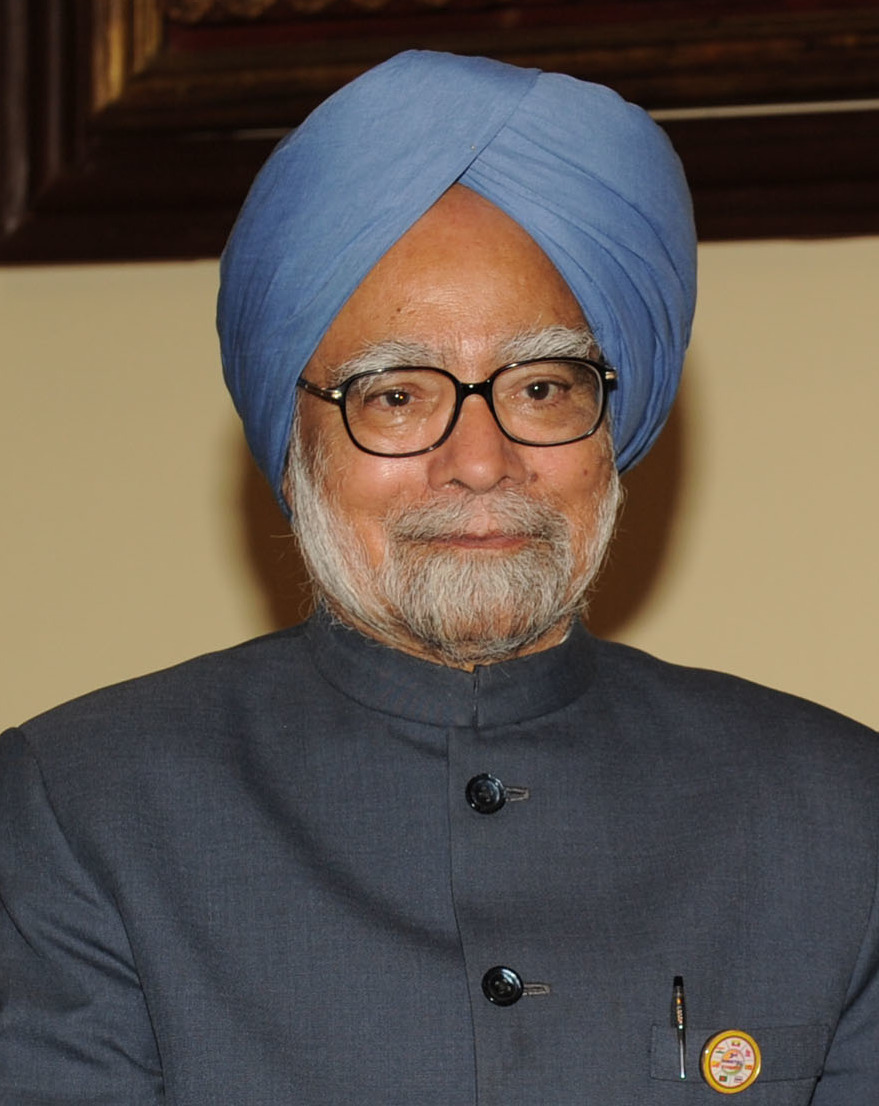
Manmohan Singh

Economic liberalisation in India was initiated in 1991 by Prime Minister P. V. Narasimha Rao and his then-Finance Minister Dr. Manmohan Singh.

The collapse of the Soviet Union, which was India's major trading partner, and the Gulf War, which caused a spike in oil prices, resulted in a major balance-of-payments crisis for India, which found itself facing the prospect of defaulting on its loans. India asked for a $1.8 billion bailout loan from the International Monetary Fund (IMF), which in return demanded de-regulation.

In response, the Narasimha Rao government, including Finance Minister Manmohan Singh, initiated economic reforms in 1991. The reforms did away with the Licence Raj, reduced tariffs and interest rates and ended many public monopolies, allowing automatic approval of foreign direct investment in many sectors. Since then, the overall thrust of liberalisation has remained the same, although no government has tried to take on powerful lobbies such as trade unions and farmers, on contentious issues such as reforming labour laws and reducing agricultural subsidies. This has been accompanied by increases in life expectancy, literacy rates, and food security, although urban residents have benefited more than rural residents.

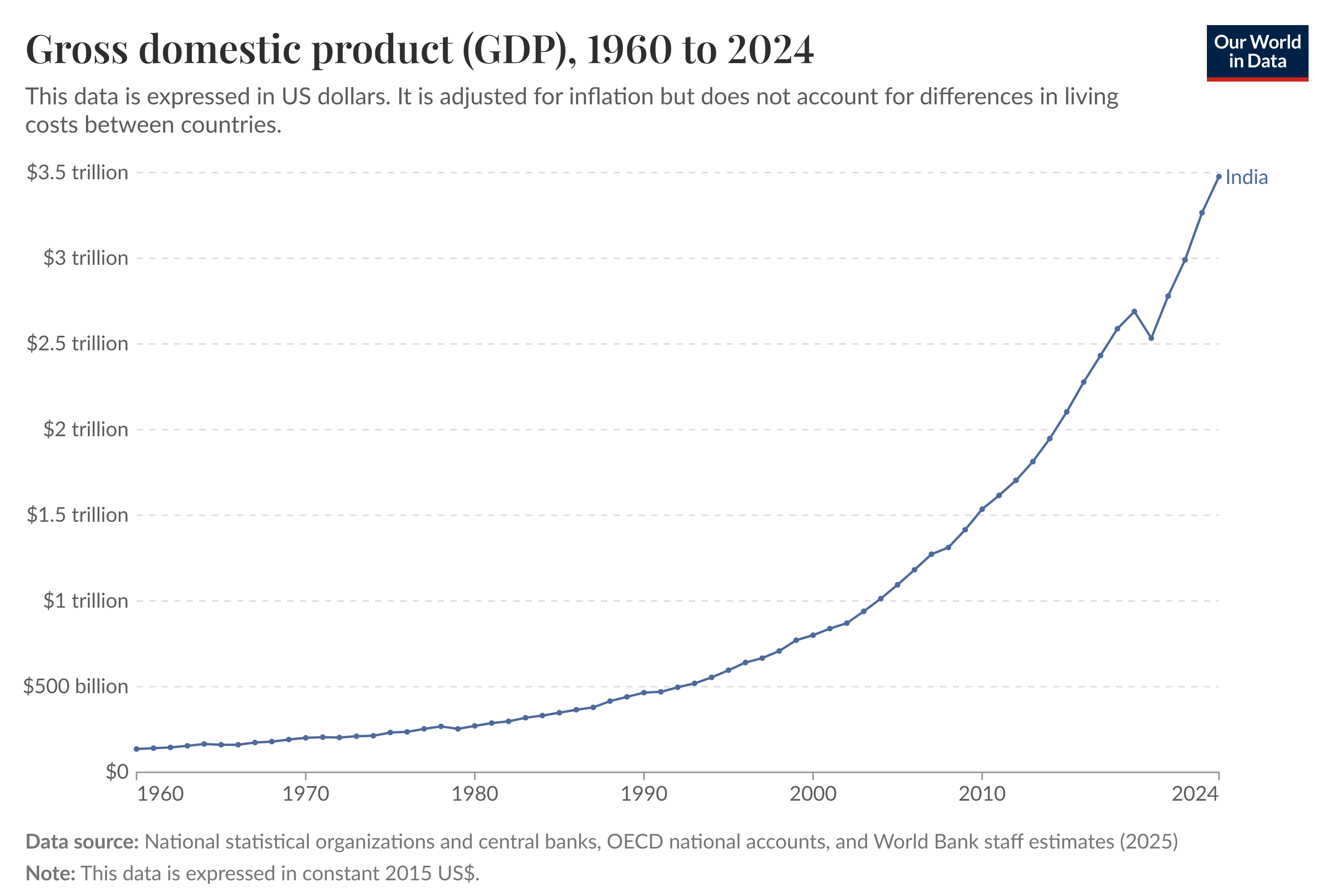
GDP grows exponentially, almost doubling every 8-9 years.

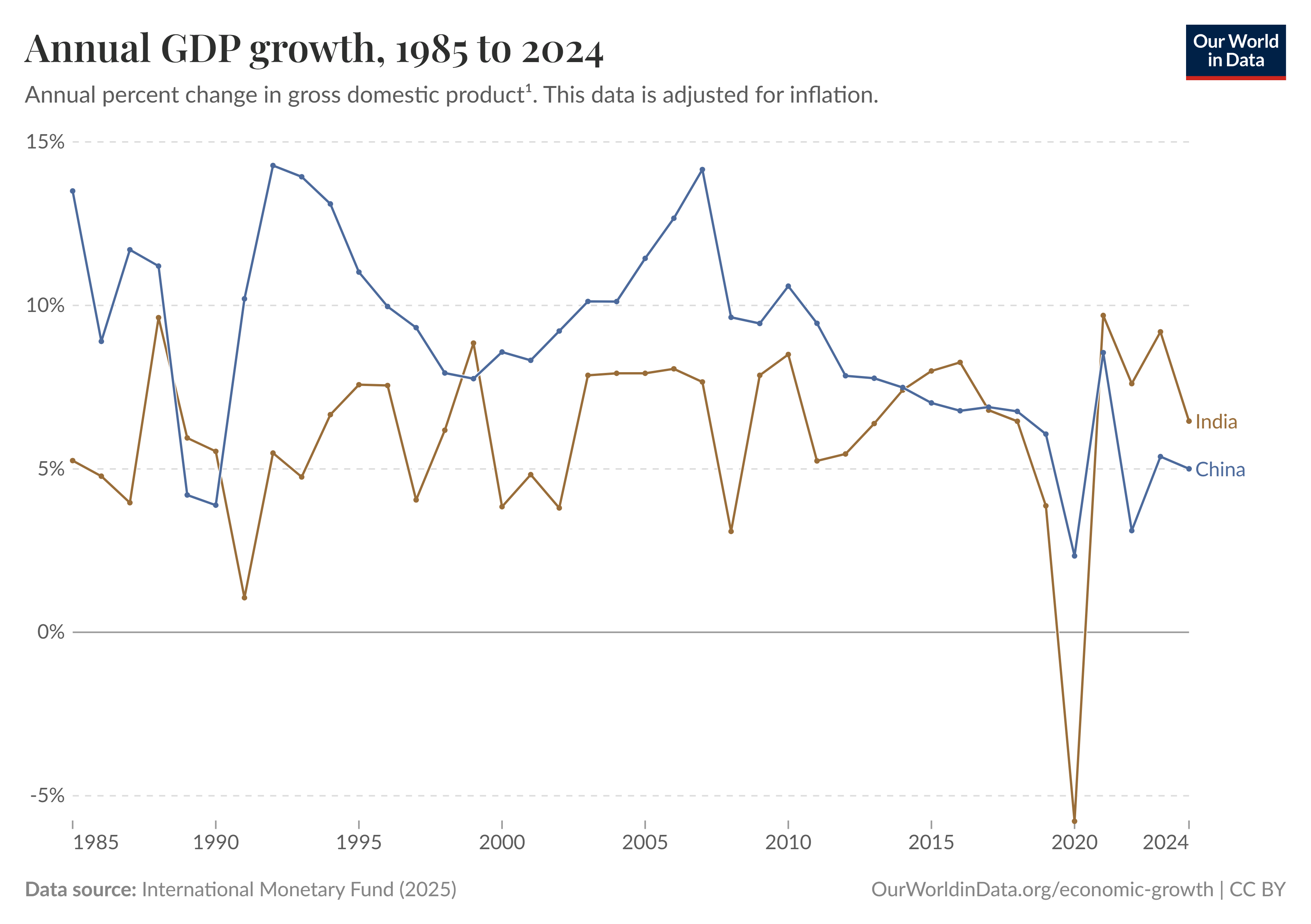
Indian GDP growth rate from 1985 to 2024, compared to that of China

From 2010, India has risen from ninth-largest to the fifth-largest economies in the world by nominal GDP in 2019 by surpassing UK, France, Italy and Brazil.

India started recovery in 2013–14 when the GDP growth rate accelerated to 6.4% from the previous year's 5.5%. The acceleration continued through 2014–15 and 2015–16 with growth rates of 7.5% and 8.0% respectively. India grew faster than China which registered 6.9% growth in 2015. However the growth rate subsequently decelerated, to 7.1% and 6.6% in 2016–17 and 2017–18 respectively, partly because of the disruptive effects of 2016 Indian banknote demonetisation and the Goods and Services Tax (India). But after slowdown due to global disruption caused by COVID-19 pandemic in 2019, India's economic growth has consistently outperformed China every year by a large margin and stays among fastest growing major economy in the world according to World Bank.

=== Real estate crisis of 2011-13 ===
The Indian real estate sector was facing severe downturn due to monetary policy under Manmohan Singh's 2nd tenure, Residential absorption across the six largest cities fell 14 per cent in 2011 and a further 16 per cent in 2012, while new launches fell 30 per cent in 2012. The debt on builders skyrocketed $24.6bn in 2011 from $3.8bn in 2005, many small- and midsized Indian property groups face the risk of default.

=== COVID-19 pandemic and new reforms (2021–present) ===
During the COVID-19 pandemic, numerous rating agencies downgraded India's GDP predictions for FY21 to negative figures, signalling a recession in India, the most severe since 1979. The Indian Economy contracted by 6.6 percent which was lower than the estimated 7.3 percent decline. In 2022, the ratings agency Fitch Ratings upgraded India's outlook to stable similar to S&P Global Ratings and Moody's Investors Service's outlooks. In the first quarter of financial year 2022–2023, the Indian economy grew by 13.5%.

With 607 million workers, India has the world's second-largest labour force, which is growing rapidly, with 46.6 million added in 2023–24 alone. India's fertility rate continues to fall sharply, from about 3.3 in 2000 to around 1.9 in 2025, below the replacement level of 2.1. Labour productivity remains lower than in advanced economies but is similar to levels observed in emerging Asian countries such as China. India's outsourcing industry has shifted from traditional call centre BPO work, now largely handled by the Philippines and other Southeast Asian countries, to high-value software development, consultancy, engineering, and research oriented services. India hosts more than half of the world's Global Capability Centres (GCCs), which perform product engineering and R&D functions. It is home to about 20% of global semiconductor chip design engineers and, as of early 2025, has an estimated 4.3 million software engineers, accounting for roughly 14.7% of the global software engineering workforce.

During the 2020s, India established free trade agreements and economic‑partnership with several countries and regional blocs, including the European Union, ASEAN, SAFTA, alongside many other with world nations. In April 2025, the Indian economy temporarily surpassed Japan to become the fourth-largest economy in the world in terms of GDP (nominal). In November 2025, the IMF gave the Indian economy a letter 'C' grade, mentioning that Indian national accounts and inflation data is not accurately recording the informal sector and people's spending patterns.

In January 2026, India and the EU have announced they have agreed on what has become known as the "mother of all deals." After 20 years of negotiations they have reached an agreement on a long term free trade agreement (FTA). The final signing will take place once all legal issues are resolved. Both sides hope it will be effective in early 2027.

In the first quarter of FY 2026–27, India's economy grew by 7.8%, exceeding market estimates by about 50 basis points. Following the release of the data, economists raised their full-year GDP growth projections to around 7%. In its August 2026 Monthly Economic Review, the Ministry of Finance stated that domestic economic activity, inflation and the external position had remained relatively stable despite global economic uncertainty, supported by resilient domestic demand, easing cost pressures and comfortable foreign-exchange reserves.

== Data ==
The following table shows the main economic indicators in 1980–2024 (with IMF staff estimates in 2025–2029). Inflation below 5% is in green. The annual unemployment rate is extracted from the World Bank, although the International Monetary Fund finds them unreliable.

| Year | GDP (in Bil. US$PPP) | GDP per capita (in US$ PPP) | GDP (in Bil. US$nominal) | GDP per capita (in US$ nominal) | GDP growth (real) | Inflation rate (in Percent) | Unemployment (in Percent) | Government debt (in % of GDP) | Central Govt debt (in % of GDP) |
|---|---|---|---|---|---|---|---|---|---|
| 1980 | 366.4 | 526.9 | 189.4 | 271.0 | ▲6.74% | ▲11.3% | n/a | n/a | n/a |
| 1981 | ▲431.5 | ▲603.2 | ▲196.5 | ▲274.7 | ▲6.01% | ▲12.7% | n/a | n/a | n/a |
| 1982 | ▲474.1 | ▲647.5 | ▲203.5 | ▲278.0 | ▲3.5% | ▲7.7% | n/a | n/a | n/a |
| 1983 | ▲528.6 | ▲705.3 | ▲222.0 | ▲296.3 | ▲7.3% | ▲12.6% | n/a | n/a | n/a |
| 1984 | ▲568.6 | ▲741.4 | ▼215.6 | ▼281.1 | ▲3.8% | ▼5.2% | n/a | n/a | n/a |
| 1985 | ▲617.4 | ▲787.1 | ▲237.6 | ▲302.9 | ▲5.3% | ▼5.56% | n/a | n/a | n/a |
| 1986 | ▲659.9 | ▲822.8 | ▲252.8 | ▲315.2 | ▲4.8% | ▲7.8% | n/a | n/a | n/a |
| 1987 | ▲703.0 | ▲857.7 | ▲283.8 | ▲346.2 | ▲4.0% | ▲9.1% | n/a | n/a | n/a |
| 1988 | ▲797.9 | ▲952.7 | ▲299.6 | ▲357.8 | ▲10.18% | ▲7.2% | n/a | n/a | n/a |
| 1989 | ▲878.5 | ▲1,027.0 | ▲301.2 | ▼352.2 | ▲5.9% | ▲4.6% | n/a | n/a | n/a |
| 1990 | ▲961.8 | ▲1,101.3 | ▲326.6 | ▲374.0 | ▲5.5% | ▲11.2% | n/a | n/a | n/a |
| 1991 | ▲1,004.8 | ▲1,127.4 | ▼274.8 | ▼308.4 | ▲1.1% | ▲13.5% | 6.8% | 75.3% | 55-58%(approx) |
| 1992 | ▲1,084.1 | ▲1,192.2 | ▲293.3 | ▲322.5 | ▲5.5% | ▲9.9% | 6.8% | ▲77.4% | n/a |
| 1993 | ▲1,162.5 | ▲1,253.5 | ▼284.2 | ▼306.4 | ▲4.8% | ▲7.3% | 6.8% | ▼77.0% | n/a |
| 1994 | ▲1,266.4 | ▲1,339.2 | ▲333.0 | ▲352.2 | ▲6.7% | ▲10.3% | 6.8% | ▼73.5% | n/a |
| 1995 | ▲1,390.8 | ▲1,442.9 | ▲366.6 | ▲380.3 | ▲7.6% | ▲10.0% | ▲7% | ▼69.7% | 50-52%(approx) |
| 1996 | ▲1,523.2 | ▲1,550.6 | ▲399.8 | ▲407.0 | ▲7.6% | ▲9.4% | ▲7.2% | ▼66.0% | n/a |
| 1997 | ▲1,612.3 | ▲1,610.8 | ▲423.2 | ▲422.8 | ▲4.1% | ▲6.8% | ▲7.3% | ▲67.8% | n/a |
| 1998 | ▲1,731.2 | ▲1,698.1 | ▲428.8 | ▼420.6 | ▲6.2% | ▲13.1% | ▲7.5% | ▲68.1% | n/a |
| 1999 | ▲1,904.2 | ▲1,834.4 | ▲466.9 | ▲449.8 | ▲8.5% | ▲5.7% | ▲7.7% | ▲70.0% | n/a |
| 2000 | ▲2,024.7 | ▲1,916.3 | ▲476.6 | ▲451.1 | ▲4.0% | ▲3.8% | ▲7.8% | ▲73.6% | 55% |
| 2001 | ▲2,172.7 | ▲2,021.1 | ▲494.0 | ▲459.5 | ▲4.9% | ▲4.3% | ▲8% | ▲78.7% | n/a |
| 2002 | ▲2,292.8 | ▲2,097.1 | ▲524.0 | ▲479.2 | ▲3.9% | ▲4.0% | ▲8.2% | ▲82.9% | n/a |
| 2003 | ▲2,523.8 | ▲2,270.6 | ▲618.4 | ▲556.3 | ▲7.9% | ▲3.9% | ▲8.4% | ▲84.4% | n/a |
| 2004 | ▲2,795.0 | ▲2,474.2 | ▲721.6 | ▲638.8 | ▲7.8% | ▲3.8% | ▲8.5% | ▼83.4% | 62.6% |
| 2005 | ▲3,066.0 | ▲2.655.3 | ▲834.2 | ▲726.9 | ▲9.3% | ▲4.4% | ▲8.7% | ▼81.0% | 62.2% |
| 2006 | ▲3,415.2 | ▲2,913.1 | ▲949.1 | ▲814.4 | ▲9.3% | ▲6.7% | ▼8.6% | ▼77.2% | n/a |
| 2007 | ▲3,776.5 | ▲3,174.3 | ▲1,238.7 | ▲1,046.9 | ▲10.3% | ▲6.2% | ▼8.5% | ▼74.1% | n/a |
| 2008 | ▲3,968.1 | ▲3,288.3 | ▼1,224.1 | ▼1,019.5 | ▲3.9% | ▲9.1% | 8.5% | ▼72.8% | n/a |
| 2009 | ▲4,306.4 | ▲3,519.4 | ▲1,365.4 | ▲1,121.2 | ▲7.9% | ▲12.3% | ▼8.4% | ▼71.5% | n/a |
| 2010 | ▲4,729.2 | ▲3,812.0 | ▲1,708.5 | ▲1,384.2 | ▲8.5% | ▲10.5% | ▼8.3% | ▼66.4% | 51.6% |
| 2011 | ▲5,079.8 | ▲4,039.1 | ▲1,823.1 | ▲1,458.1 | ▲6.6% | ▲9.5% | ▼8.2% | ▲68.6% | n/a |
| 2012 | ▲5,456.7 | ▲4,281.4 | ▲1,827.6 | ▼1,443.9 | ▲5.5% | ▲10.0% | ▼8.1% | ▼68.0% | n/a |
| 2013 | ▲5,904.0 | ▲4,572.7 | ▲1,856.7 | ▲1,449.6 | ▲6.4% | ▲9.4% | 8.1% | ▼67.7% | n/a |
| 2014 | ▲6,451.9 | ▲4,935.5 | ▲2,039.1 | ▲1,573.9 | ▲7.4% | ▲5.8% | ▼8% | ▼67.1% | 49.9% |
| 2015 | ▲7,032.5 | ▲5,316.1 | ▲2,103.6 | ▲1,605.6 | ▲8.0% | ▲4.9% | ▼7.9% | ▲69.0% | ▲50.0% |
| 2016 | ▲7,685.5 | ▲5,741.2 | ▲2,294.8 | ▲1,732.6 | ▲8.3% | ▲4.5% | ▼7.8% | ▼68.9% | ▼47.6% |
| 2017 | ▲8,354.7 | ▲6,169.5 | ▲2,702.9 | ▲1,958.0 | ▲6.8% | ▲3.6% | ▼7.7% | ▲69.7% | 47.6% |
| 2018 | ▲9,230.8 | ▲6,742.7 | ▲2,702.9 | ▲1,974.4 | ▲6.5% | ▲3.4% | 7.7% | ▲70.4% | ▼46.5% |
| 2019 | ▲9,932.8 | ▲7,181.5 | ▲2,835.6 | ▲2,050.2 | ▲4.2% | ▲4.8% | ▼6.5% | ▲75.0% | ▲48-49% |
| 2020 | ▼9,771.0 | ▼6,997,4 | ▼2,674.8 | ▼1,915.6 | ▼-5.8% | ▲6.1% | ▲7.9% | ▲88.5%(PEAK) | ▲55-57% |
| 2021 | ▲11,384.4 | ▲8,088.0 | ▲3,167.3 | ▲2,250.1 | ▲9.7% | ▼5.5% | ▼6.4% | ▼83.7% | ▲58-59% |
| 2022 | ▲13,048.1 | ▲9,207.2 | ▲3,389.7 | ▲2,391.9 | ▲7.6% | ▲6.7% | ▼4.8% | ▼81.0% | ▼57-58% |
| 2023 | ▲14,619.8 | ▲10,233.4 | ▲3,567.5 | ▲2,497.2 | ▲9.2% | ▼5.5% | ▼4.7% | ▲81.9% | 57-58% |
| 2024 | ▲16,020.0 | ▲11,111.7 | ▲3,889.1 | ▲2,697.6 | ▲7.0% | ▼4.6% | n/a | ▲83.0% | ▼57% |
| 2025 | ▲17,364.8 | ▲11,937.8 | ▲4,271.9 | ▲2,936.8 | ▲7.6% | ▼4.1% | n/a | ▼82.6% | ▼57-56% |
| 2026 | ▲18,831.4 | ▲12,834.6 | ▲4,710.4 | ▲3,210.4 | ▲7.0% | ▲4.1% | n/a | ▼81.8% | ▼56.2-55.4% |
| 2027 | ▲20,420.1 | ▲13,801.3 | ▲5,193.5 | ▲3,510.1 | ▲7.0% | ▼4.0% | n/a | ▼80.7% | ▼55.4%-54.3% |
| 2028 | ▲22,143.7 | ▲14,844.9 | ▲5,723.2 | ▲3,836.8 | ▲7.0% | ▲4.0% | n/a | ▼80.0% | ▼54.3-53.0% |
| 2029 | ▲24,015.1 | ▲15,973.1 | ▲6,307.2 | ▲4,195.1 | ▲7.0% | ▲4.0% | n/a | ▼78.4% | ▼53.0-51.7% |
| 2030 | | | | | | | | ▼76.9% | ▼50.3% |

== Regulatory environment ==
Although the License Raj was formally dismantled in 1991, studies describe a heavy compliance burden on businesses. A 2022 report by the Observer Research Foundation and TeamLease Services noted that Indian businesses face over 69,000 individual compliance obligations and 6,600 recurring statutory filings each year under 1536 federal and state laws. It also found that 37.8% (over 26,000) of these compliances obligations carried imprisonment as a penalty. A 2025 study by Vidhi Centre for Legal Policy identified over 7,300 distinct criminal offences across 370 of about 890 central laws then in force. Earlier academic estimates ranged from 12,000 to 1,50,000. Critics argue that criminal penalties have spread indiscriminately into civil, economic and regulatory matters and have become a tool of routine administration. Some economists link the compliance burden to the size of the informal sector, which employs about 90% of the workforce. India ranked 88th out of 165 economies in Fraser Institute's Economic Freedom of the World Index 2026, scoring 6.62 out of 10.

== Tariffs and industrial policy ==
For two decades, India's import duties fell. However, since 2018, India's trade regime has become more protectionist. The government has increased tariffs on electronics, automobile components, textiles, and a range of consumer goods according to Cato Institute, a free-market think tank. The World Trade Organization's 2021 review of India's trade policy found that the simple average most favoured nation rate rose from 13% in 2014-15 to 14.3% in 2020-21. The review also described India as WTO's main user of anti-dumping measures, with 233 investigations initiated between 2015 and 2019 and 254 anti-dumping duties in force at the end of 2019.

In May 2020, the government announced "Atmanirbhar Bharat" (self-reliant India), a package of stimulus and Industrial Policy measures presented as reducing dependence on imports. The Production Linked Incentive Schemes, announced as part of the package with an initial budget outlay of ₹40,000 crore (equivalent to ₹510 billion or US$5.5 billion in 2026), expanded to a budget outlay of ₹1.97 lakh crore (US$21 billion) across 14 sectors by 2026.

== Economic sectors ==
Percent of share in GDP of India contributing from various sector in 2023-24
1. Financial, real estate & professional services (22.9%)
2. Trade, hotels, transport, communication and broadcasting (18.3%)
3. Manufacturing (17.0%)
4. Agriculture, forestry and fishing (14.3%)
5. Public Administration, defence and other services (12.5%)
6. Construction (8.89%)
7. Electricity, gas, water supply & other utility services (2.32%)
8. Mining & quarrying (2.09%)

=== Agriculture, fishing, and forestry ===
Agriculture and allied sectors like forestry, logging and fishing accounted for 18.4% of the GDP, the sector employed 51.2 crore persons or 45.5% of the workforce in India are employed in agriculture. India is major agriculture producing country and has the most arable land in the world followed by the United States. However, agricultural output lags far behind its potential. Agriculture's contribution to GDP has steadily declined from 1951 to 2023, shifting from 52% to 15% of India's GDP yet it is still the country's largest employment provider sector . Crop-yield-per-unit-area of all crops has grown since 1950, due to the special emphasis placed on agriculture in the five-year plans and steady improvements in irrigation, technology, application of modern agricultural practices and provision of agricultural credit and subsidies since the Green Revolution in India. International comparisons reveal the average yield in India is generally 30% to 50% of the highest average yield in the world. The states of Uttar Pradesh, Punjab, Haryana, Madhya Pradesh, Andhra Pradesh, Telangana, Bihar, West Bengal, Gujarat and Maharashtra are key contributors to Indian agriculture.

India receives an average annual rainfall of 1,208 millimetres (47.6 in) and a total annual precipitation of 4,000 billion cubic metres, with the total utilisable water resources, including surface and groundwater, amounting to 1,123 billion cubic metres. 546,820 square kilometres (211,130 mi^{2}) of the land area, or about 39% of the total cultivated area, is irrigated. India's inland water resources and marine resources provide employment to nearly 6 million people in the fisheries sector. In 2023, according to the Ministry of Fisheries, India is the 3rd largest fish producing and 2nd largest aquaculture producing nation in the world.

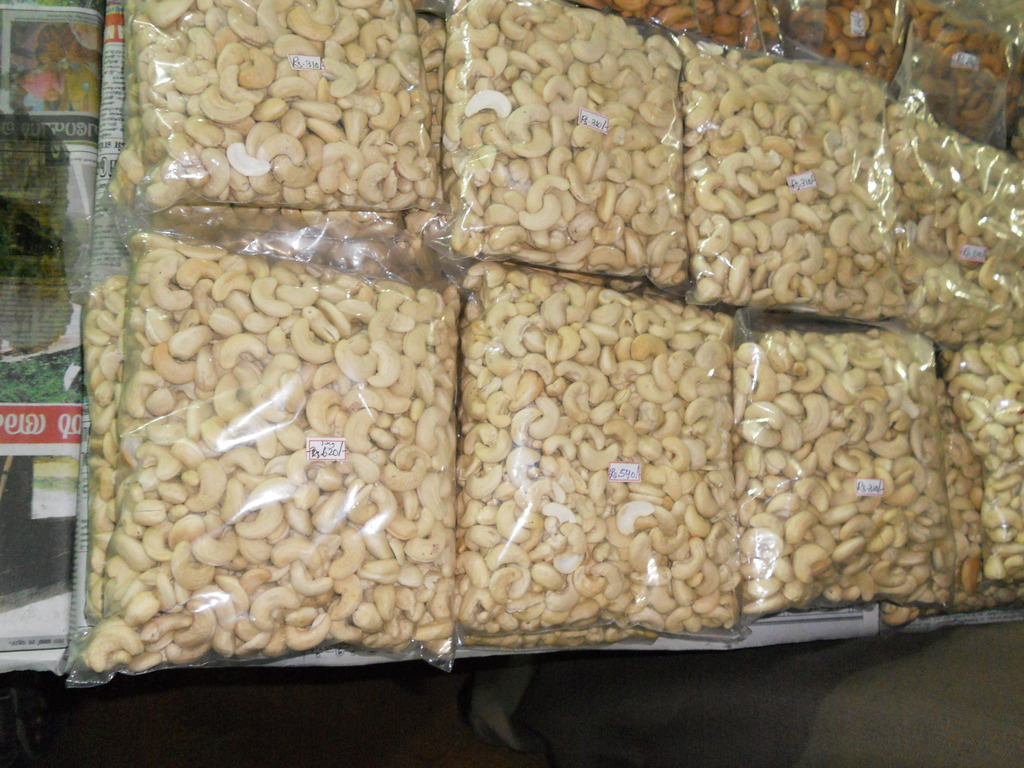
India exports more than 100,000 tonnes (98,000 long tons; 110,000 short tons) of processed cashew kernels every year. There are more than 600 cashew processing units in Kollam alone.

India is the largest producer of milk, jute and pulses, and has the world's largest cattle population with 303 million animals in 2023. It is the second-largest producer of rice, wheat, sugarcane, cotton and groundnuts, as well as the second-largest fruit and vegetable producer, accounting for 10.9% and 8.6% of the world fruit and vegetable production, respectively, but only for 1% of global fruits and vegetables trade. India is also the second-largest producer and the largest consumer of silk, producing 77,000 tonnes (76,000 long tons; 85,000 short tons) in 2005. India is the second-largest exporter of cashew kernels and cashew nut shell liquid (CNSL). Foreign exchange earned by the country through the export of cashew kernels during FY 2023 reached 356M$. 76,624 tonnes (75,414 long tons; 84,464 short tons) of kernels were exported during 2023. There are about 600 cashew processing units in Kollam, Kerala.

India's foodgrain production stagnant at approximately 316 megatonnes (311 million long tons; 348 million short tons) during 2020–21. India exports several agriculture products, such as Basmati rice, wheat, cereals, spices, fresh fruits, dry fruits, cotton, tea, coffee, milk products and other cash crops to the Asian, African and other countries.

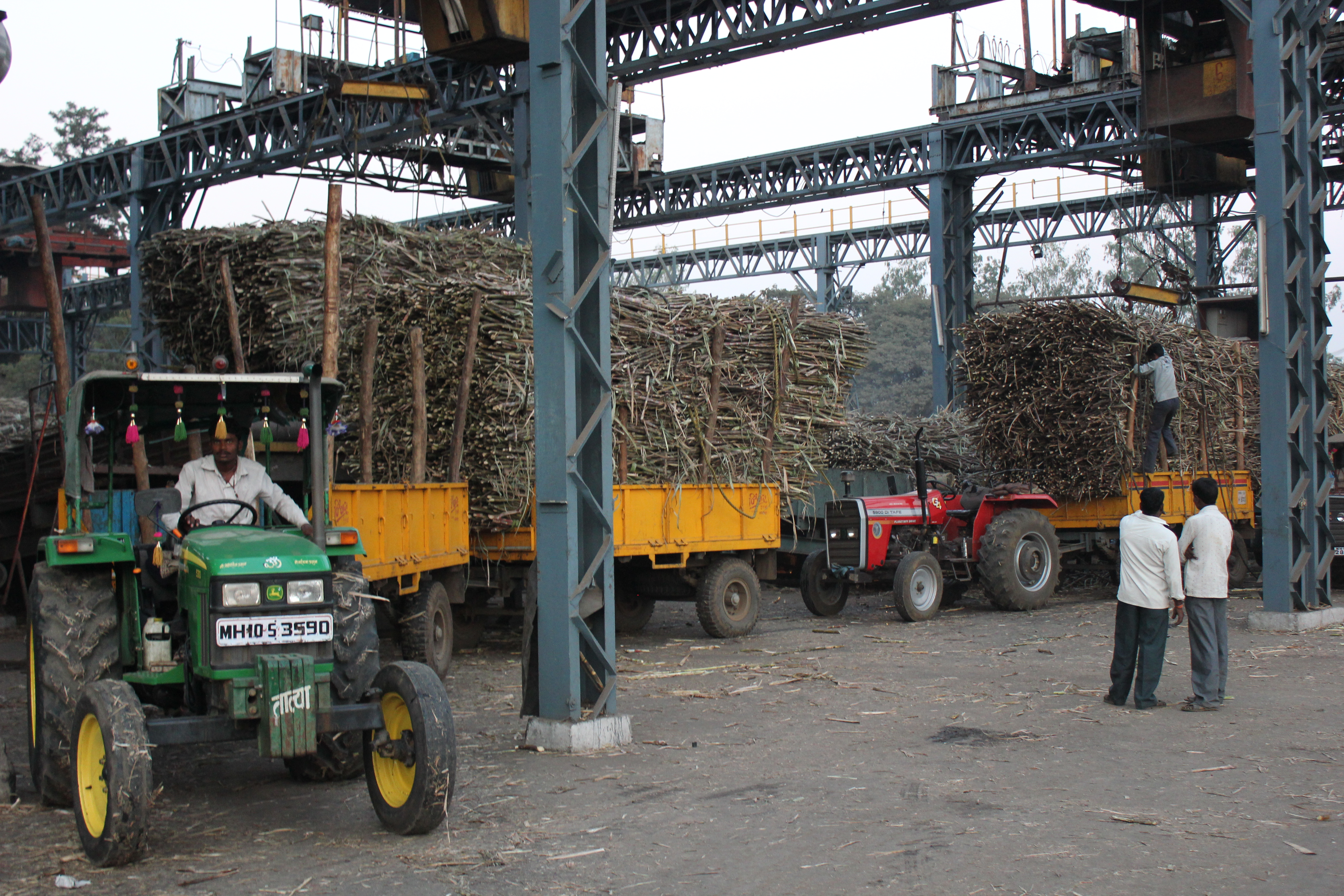
Sugarcane weighing at a Pravara Sahakari Sakhar Karkhana Ltd in Maharashtra

=== Micro, Small, and Medium Enterprises (MSME) ===
India began its first few steps during the years 1978-80 when early conditions for SMEs or entrepreneurship were hostile too. 63 million MSMEs in India which contribute 35% to the country's GDP provides employment to 111.4 million persons and accounts for more than 40% of India's exports and are hailed as the 'growth engines' of the economy. China has been creating 16,000-18,000 new enterprises per day for the last 5 years. When one compares that with India, it is about 1000-1100 per day.

=== Industrial machinery, tools and manufacturing equipment ===
Machinery and equipment market is expected to grow 8% from 2024 to 2029. India's Industrial Machinery Equipment and Tools market size is expected to be $210 billion in 2023.The rise in R&D and large number of startups has led to increase in investment in tools, industrial equipment, robotics, industrial automation, pharmaceutical machinery, mining & construction equipment. The Indian Government has launched an initiative in promoting electrification of fossil-fuel based equipment hence reducing carbon footprint and leading to new innovations.

=== Pulp and paper industry ===
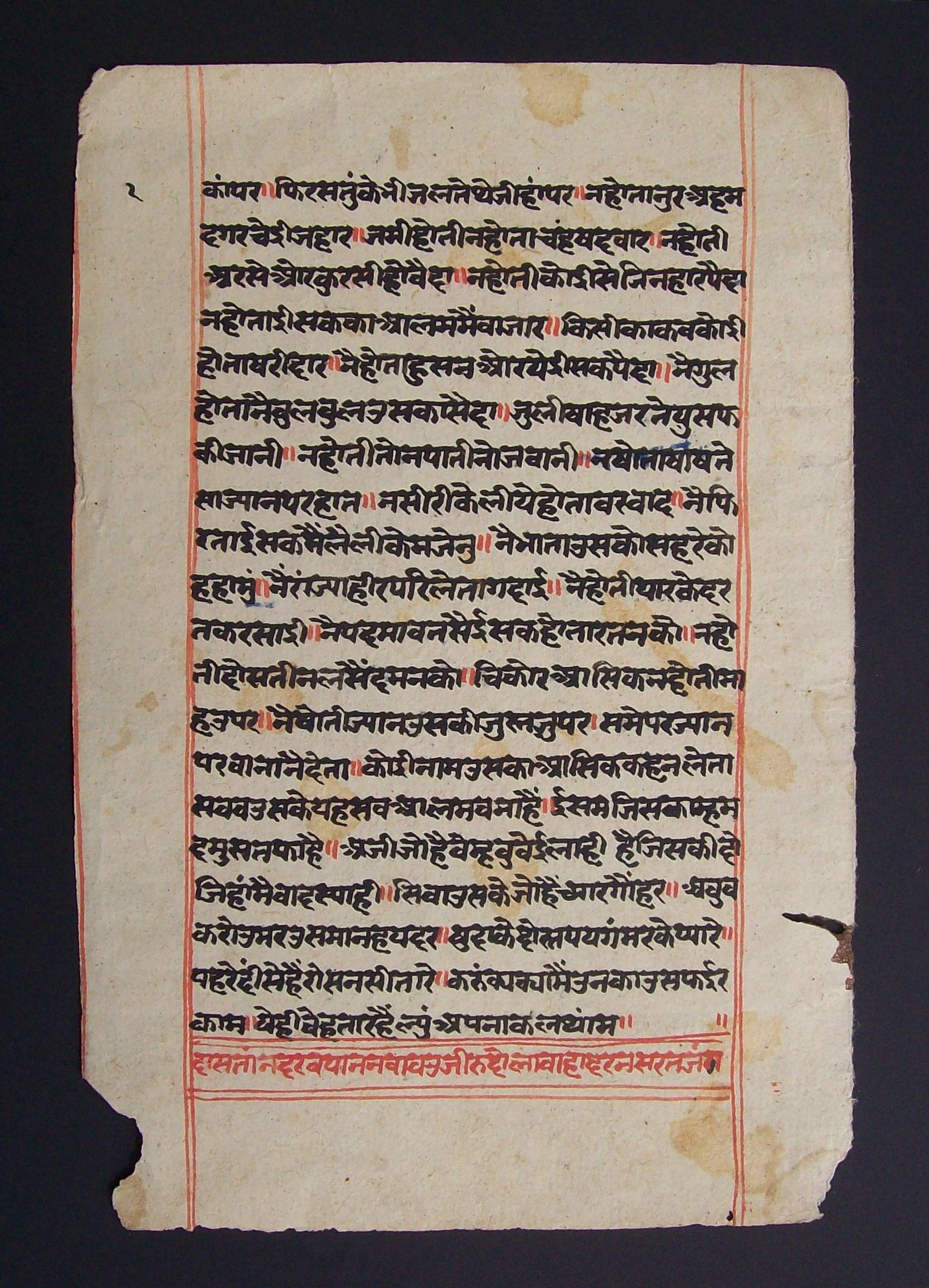
Ancient Sanskrit on hemp based paper. Hemp fiber was commonly used in the production of paper from 200 BCE to the late 1800s.

The pulp and paper industry in India is the 5th largest industrial sector in India. India accounts for approximately 5% of global paper production and ranks 15th globally in terms of total output. The industry provides 0.5 million direct and 1.5 million indirect employment. Its estimated turnover was ₹80,000 crore in 2024. There are 900 paper mills in India, with most of them being located in Gujarat, Maharashtra and Uttar Pradesh.

It produces a wide range of products including writing and printing paper, newsprint, packaging board and specialty paper. The sector plays a key role in supporting education, information circulation and packaging. Production capacity is around 25–26 million tonnes annually, with installed capacity at about 30-32 million tonnes. Per capita paper consumption is relatively low: about 15–17 kg per year.

=== Mining, resources, and chemicals ===
==== Mining ====
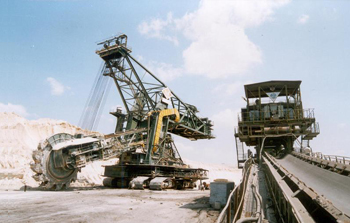
an NLC India mine

India has, in 2022, a reported 1,319 mines of which reporting mines for metallic minerals were estimated at 545 and non-metallic minerals at 775.

Mining contributed to 1.75% of GDP and employed directly or indirectly 11 million people in 2021. India's mining industry was the fourth-largest producer of minerals in the world by volume, and eighth-largest producer by value in 2009. In 2013, it mined and processed 89 minerals, of which four were fuel, three were atomic energy minerals, and 80 non-fuel. The public sector accounted for 68% of mineral production by volume in 2011–12. India has the world's fourth-largest natural resources, with the mining sector contributing 11% of the country's industrial GDP and 2.5% of total GDP.

Nearly 50% of India's mining industry, by output value, is concentrated in eight states: Odisha, Rajasthan, Chhattisgarh, Andhra Pradesh, Telangana, Jharkhand, Madhya Pradesh and Karnataka. Another 25% of the output by value comes from offshore oil and gas resources. India operated about 3,000 mines in 2010, half of which were coal, limestone and iron ore. On output-value basis, India was one of the five largest producers of mica, chromite, coal, lignite, iron ore, bauxite, barite, zinc and manganese; while being one of the ten largest global producers of many other minerals. India was the fourth-largest producer of steel in 2013, and the seventh-largest producer of aluminium.

India also holds the world's third-largest reserves of rare earth elements (approx. 6.9 million tonnes; 7% of global reserves), with deposits concentrated in states such as Odisha, Andhra Pradesh, Tamil Nadu, Kerala and West Bengal. Despite its large reserves, its high-value processing capability is limited and rely heavily on imports from China.

==== Iron and steel ====
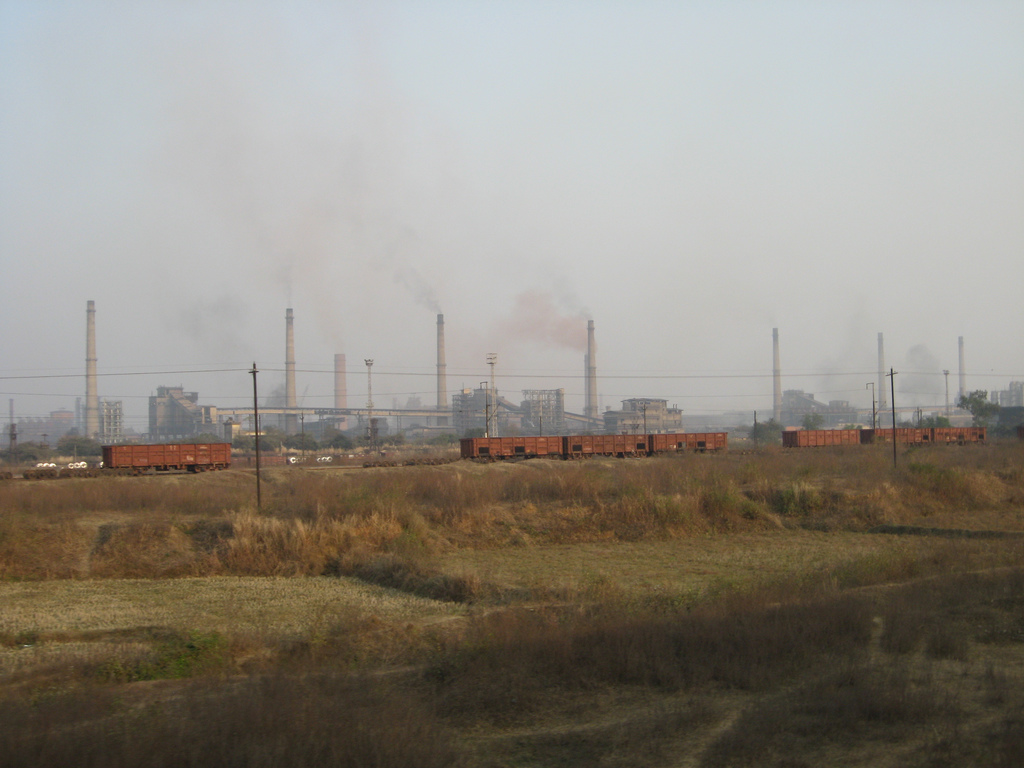
Bokaro Steel Plant (BSL) alone contributes 45% of SAIL's profit and it produces highly diversified steel portfolio

India surpassed Japan as the second largest steel producer in January 2019. As per worldsteel, India's crude steel production in 2018 was at 106.5 tonnes (104.8 long tons; 117.4 short tons), 4.9% increase from 101.5 tonnes (99.9 long tons; 111.9 short tons) in 2017, which means that India overtook Japan as the world's second largest steel production country.

==== Petroleum ====
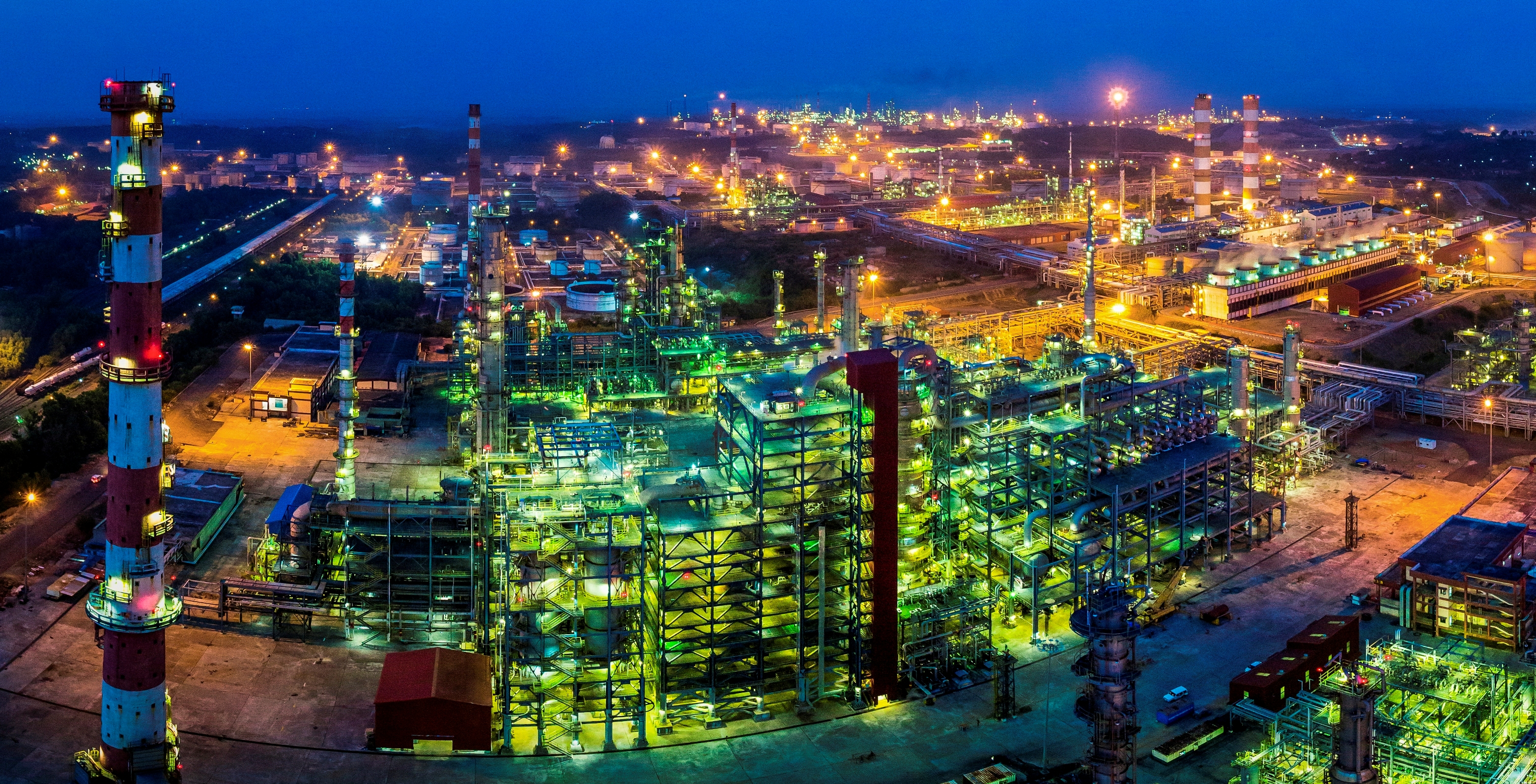
MRPL Refinery in Mangalore

Petroleum products and chemicals are a major contributor to India's industrial GDP, and together they contribute over 34% of its export earnings. India hosts many oil refineries and petrochemical operations developed with help of Soviet technology such as Barauni Refinery and Gujarat Refinery, it also includes the world's largest refinery complex in Jamnagar that processes 1.24 million barrels of crude per day. By volume, the Indian chemical industry was the third-largest producer in Asia, and contributed 5% of the country's GDP. India is one of the five-largest producers of agrochemicals, polymers and plastics, dyes and various organic and inorganic chemicals. Despite being a large producer and exporter, India is a net importer of chemicals due to domestic demands. India's chemical industry is extremely diversified and estimated at $178 billion.

==== Chemicals and fertilizer ====
The chemical industry contributed $163 billion to the economy in FY18 and is expected to reach $300–400 billion by 2025. The industry employed 17.33 million people (4% of the workforce) in 2016.

=== Textile ===
The textile industry in India, traditionally after agriculture, is the only industry in the country that has generated large-scale employment for both skilled and unskilled labour. The textile industry continues to be the second-largest employment generating sector in India. It offers direct employment to over 35 million people in the country. India is the world's second largest exporter of textiles and clothing, and in the fiscal year 2022, the exports stood at US$44.4 billion. According to the Ministry of Textiles, the share of textiles in total exports during April–July 2010 was 11.04%. During 2009–2010, the Indian textile industry was pegged at US$55 billion, 64% of which serves domestic demand. In 2010, there were 2,500 textile weaving factories and 4,135 textile finishing factories in all of India. According to AT Kearney’s ‘Retail Apparel Index’, India was ranked as the fourth most promising market for apparel retailers in 2009.

India is the second largest producer of fibre. The country is the world's largest producer of cotton and jute. India is also the world's second largest producer of silk. Other fibres produced in India include wool, and man-made fibres. 100% FDI is allowed via automatic route in textile sector. Rieter, Trutzschler, Saurer, Soktas, Zambiati, Bilsar, Monti, CMT, E-land, Nisshinbo, Marks & Spencer, Zara, Promod, Benetton, and Levi’s are some of the foreign textile companies invested or working in India. Between January and July 2021, India exported textile products worth Rs 1.77 lakh crore, which is 52.6% more than the same period last year.

=== Pharmaceuticals ===
The pharmaceutical industry in India was valued at an estimated US$50 billion in FY 2023-24 and is estimated to reach $130 billion by 2030. India is often described as the “pharmacy of the world,” supplying around one-fifth of global demand for generic medicines and exporting pharmaceuticals to over 200 countries in 2023–24, with approximately 70% of exports destined for highly regulated markets such as North America and Europe. In the United States, Indian pharmaceutical companies supply nearly half of all generic prescriptions by volume. India is also the largest vaccine manufacturer globally by volume, accounting for over 60% of the world’s vaccine production.

According to Economic Survey 2023, the turnover in the domestic pharmaceutical market was estimated to be $41 billion. India's pharmaceutical exports revenue was $25.3 billion in fiscal year 2022–23, according to the data released by Pharmexcil. India ranked third globally in terms of dollar value of drugs and medicines exports.

Major pharmaceutical hubs in India are, broadly anticlockwise from the northwest: Baddi, Paonta Sahib, Sikkim, Kolkata, Visakhapatnam, Hyderabad, Bangalore, Mysore, Chennai, Pondicherry, Goa, Mumbai, Navi Mumbai, Pune, Aurangabad, Indore, Pithampur, Ahmedabad, Vadodara, Ankleshwar, and Vapi.

=== Transportation ===
==== Railways and Logistics ====
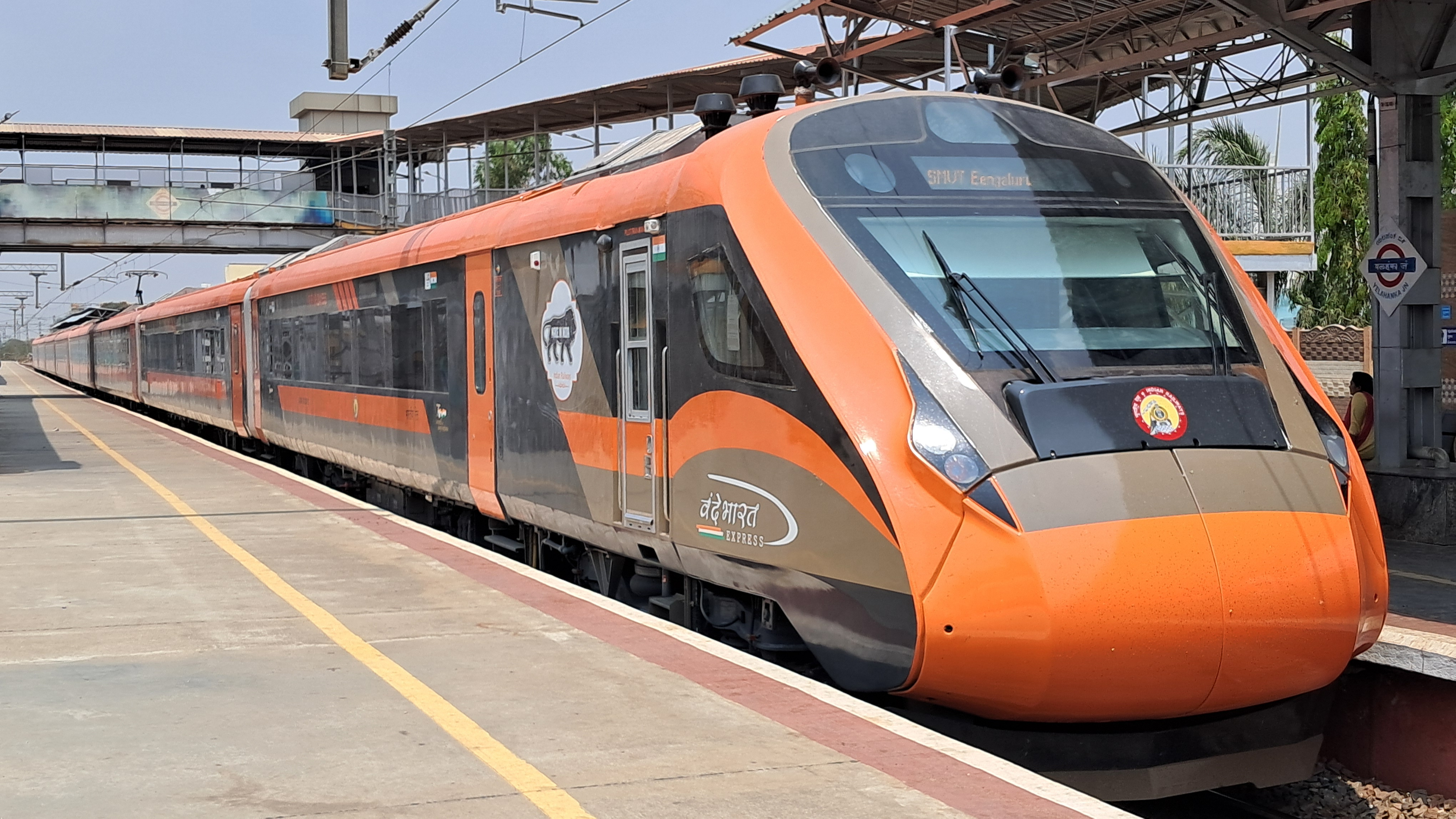
Vande Bharat train

The Indian Railways contributes to ~3% of the country's gross domestic product (GDP) and has social obligations pegged at $5.3 billion annually. Indian Railways revenue has grown at 5% CAGR in the past 5 years but profitability has reduced drastically in the past 4 years, due to growing infrastructure and modernization expenses. With a workforce of 1.31 million people, the IR is also one of the country's largest employers. The railways is a major contributor to jobs, GDP, and mobility.

Indian Railways has decided to revise its 2022–23 rolling stock production plan upwards. The Ministry's new plan targets the production of 8,429 units for the coming financial year. Production for 2022–23 has been raised by 878 units from the earlier planned 7,551, according to the revised targets. Indian Railways has targeted to manufacture 475 new Vande Bharat trainsets for the next four years as a part of its modernization plan. It is about Rs 40,000 crore($5 billion) business opportunity that would also create 15,000 jobs and several spin-off benefits. Indian Railway's CORE aims to electrify all of its broad gauge network by 31 March 2024. The entire electrified mainline rail network in India uses 25 kV AC; DC is used only for metros. As of July 2023, India currently has 90% of total train tracks fully electrified.

==== Rapid Transit ====
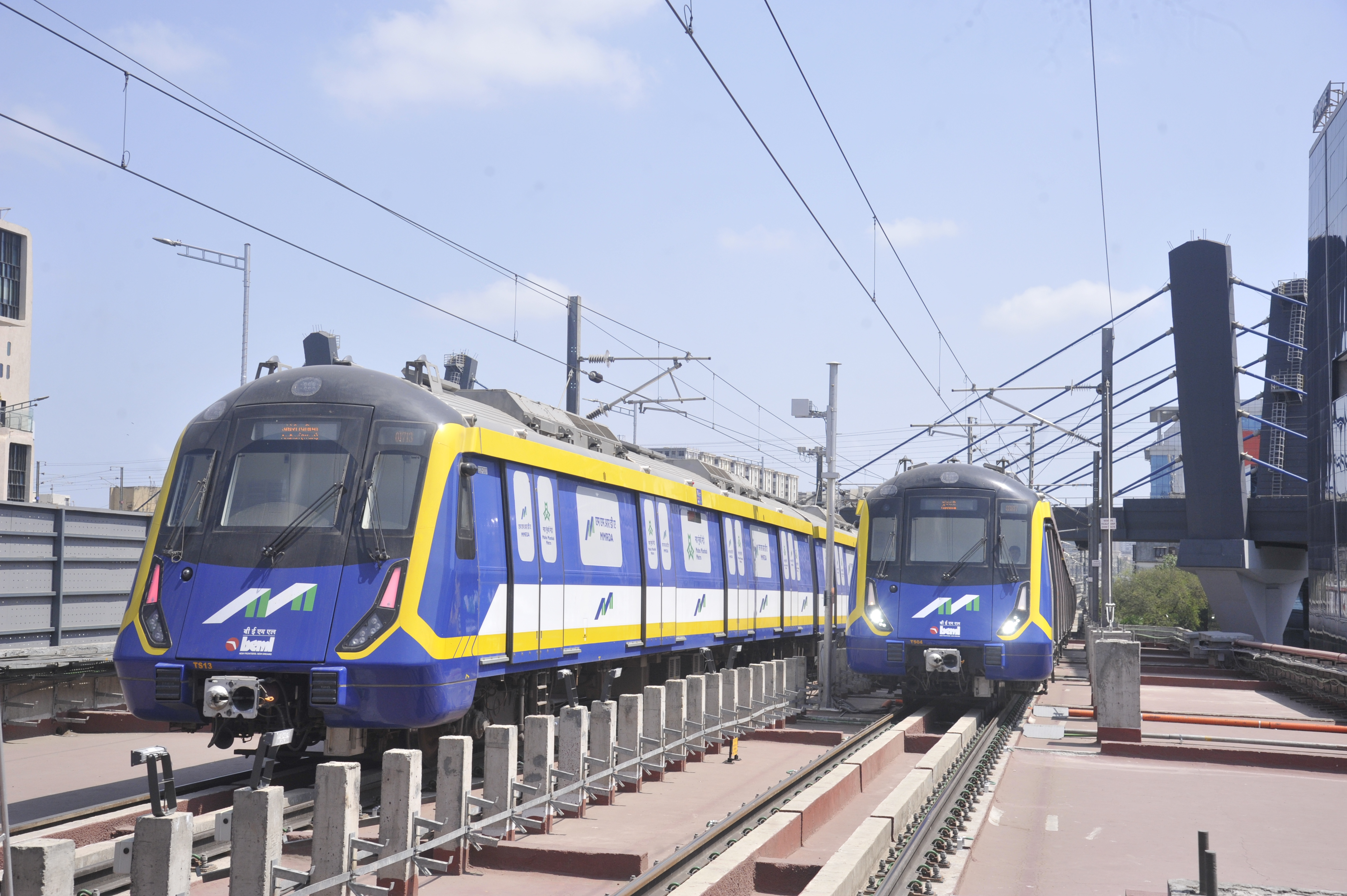
As of 2026, India's 21 metro systems together constitute the third largest metro network in the world

India is developing modern mass rapid transit systems to meet present and future urban requirements. A modern metro rail system is already in place in the cities of Navi Mumbai, Delhi, Mumbai, Bangalore, Kolkata, Hyderabad, Kochi, Gurgaon, Jaipur, Noida, Pune, Nagpur, Kanpur, Ahmedabad and Lucknow. Similar mass transit systems are intended for Agra, Bhopal, Indore, Surat, Patna, Bhubaneswar Tri-city, Chandigarh Tri-city, Gwalior, Mysore, Nashik, Prayagraj, Varanasi, Ranchi, Thane and Trivandrum. Former Prime Minister Atal Bihari Vajpayee has been credited with success of the metro systems in India and every metro has followed Delhi Metro model generating lot of real estate wealth in India specially in smaller cities like Gurgaon and Noida. For Elevated corridor, there is no need for land acquisition as pillars are built above Median strip of a road. Land prices in tier-II cities such as Lucknow, Patna, Jaipur, Ahmedabad, Pune, Kochi, and Coimbatore have gone up by almost 8-10 percent following the introduction of a metro corridor in these cities, an assessment by JLL has said.

==== Aviation ====
India is the fourth-largest civil aviation market in the world recording an air traffic of 158 million passengers in 2017. The market is estimated to have 800 aircraft by 2020, which would account for 4.3% of global volumes, and is expected to record annual passenger traffic of 520 million by 2037. IATA estimated that aviation contributed $30 billion to India's GDP in 2017, and supported 7.5 million jobs – 390,000 directly, 570,000 in the value chain, and 6.2 million through tourism.

As of 2024, There are 75 new airports have been built in the last ten years, taking the total count to 149 airports (include helipads and aerodromes).

==== Shipbuilding ====
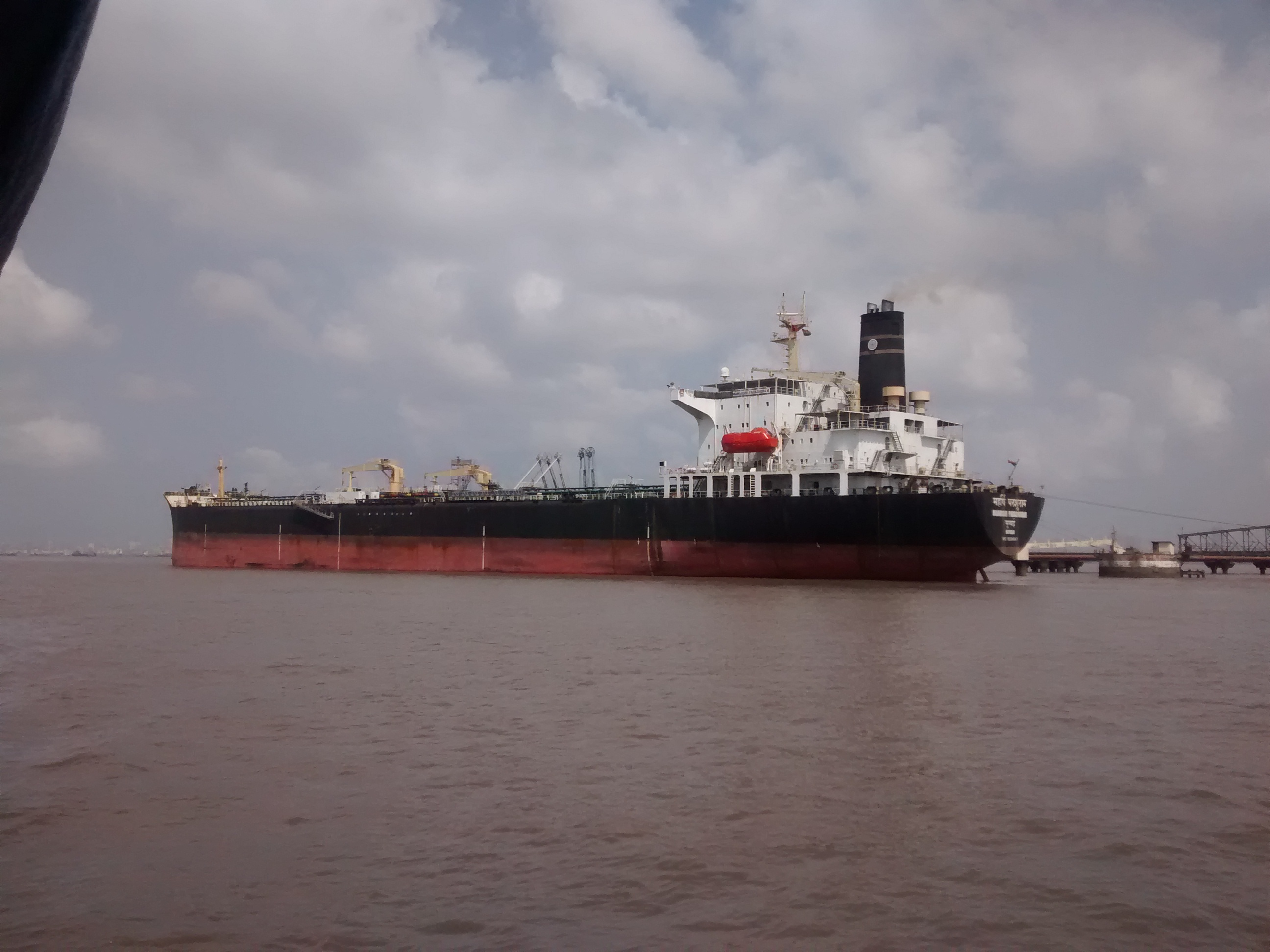
Maharishi Parshuram built in 2002 by Cochin Shipyard for SCI

The Shipbuilding Financial Assistance Policy (SBFAP) was introduced in 2016, provides financial assistance to Indian shipyards for shipbuilding contracts. According to the ministry of ports, shipping and waterways, under SBFAP, a total of 313 domestic and export vessel orders were procured by 39 shipyards since the inception of the scheme, with the total value standing at about ₹10,500 crore($1.26 billion).

India has multiple ship building companies such as Cochin Shipyard, Hindustan Shipyard and Swan Defence and Heavy Industries, mainly produces ships for European, South American and African shipping companies. Cochin shipyard is the pioneer in autonomous electric propulsion ships.

=== IT and telecommunications ===
==== Datacentre and cloud ====
India has emerged as the leading data centre hub in the Asia-Pacific region (excluding China), surpassing established players like Singapore, Australia, South Korea, Japan, and Hong Kong in installed capacity. This reflects the escalating demand for data services in one of the world's fastest-growing major economies. With a current installed capacity of 950 MW and projections indicating an additional 850 MW by 2026, India is poised to solidify its position as a key player in the Asia-Pacific data centre landscape.

==== Telecommunications ====
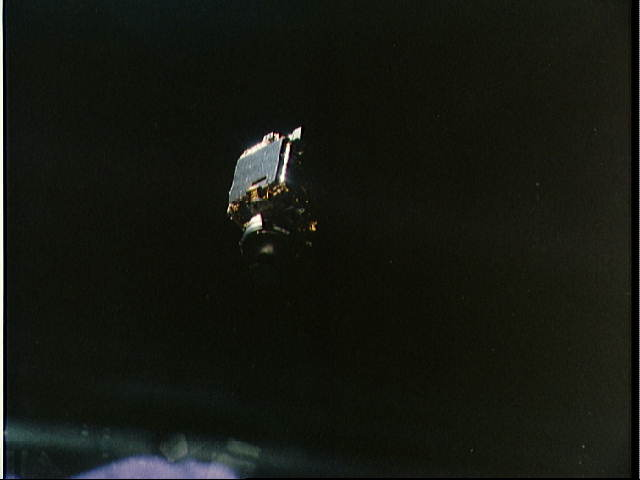
INSAT-1B satellite: broadcasting sector in India is highly dependent on INSAT system.

The telecommunication sector generated ₹2.20 trillion (US$24 billion) in revenue in 2014–15, accounting for 1.94% of total GDP. Telecom equipment manufacturing and exports are becoming a new success story following the success of smartphone exports. In the financial year 2024, the telecom equipment production exceeded the milestone of Rs 45,000 crore with exports totaling approximately Rs 10,500 crore.

=== Defence ===
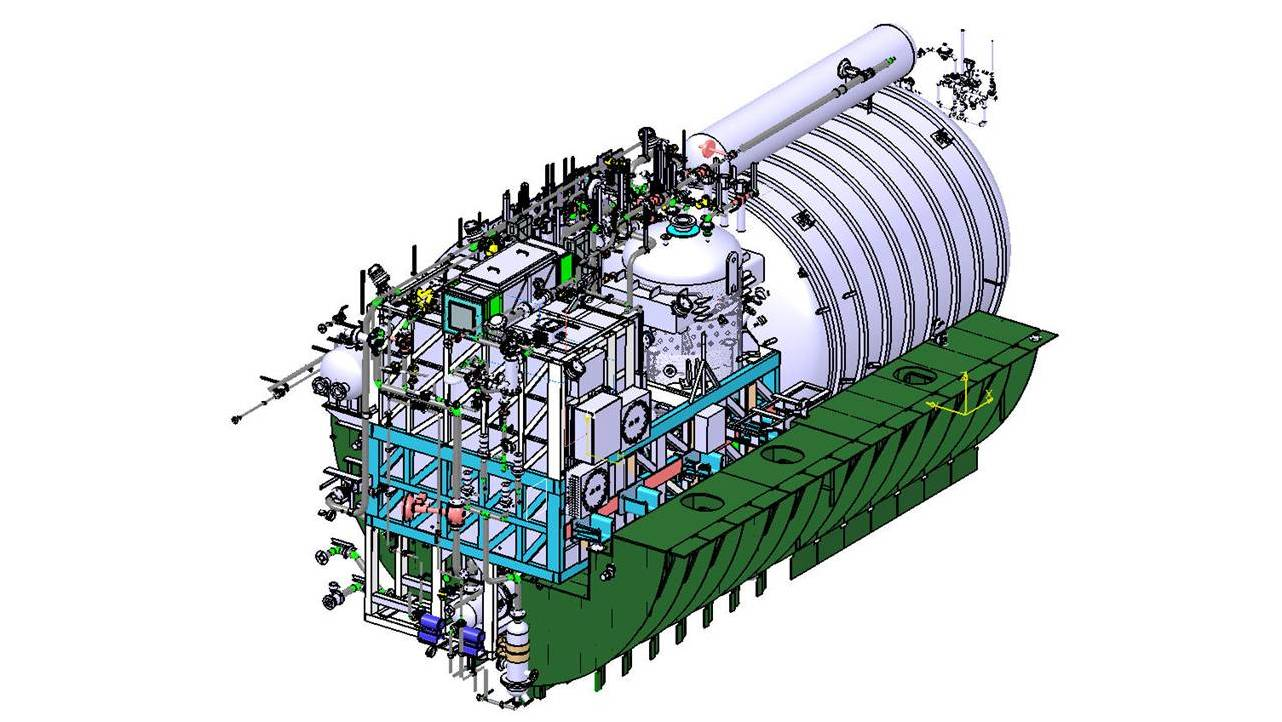
PAFC AIP fuel-cell module developed by the DRDO of India to power marine transport

With over 1.3 million active personnel, the Indian Army is the third-largest military force and the largest volunteer army. Defence expenditure was pegged at US$70.12 billion for fiscal year 2022–23 and, increased 9.8% than previous fiscal year. India is the world's second largest arms importer; between 2016 and 2020, it accounted for 9.5% of the total global arms imports. India exported military hardware worth ₹159.2 billion (US$1.7 billion) in the financial year 2022–23, the highest ever and a notable tenfold increase since 2016–17.

=== Energy ===
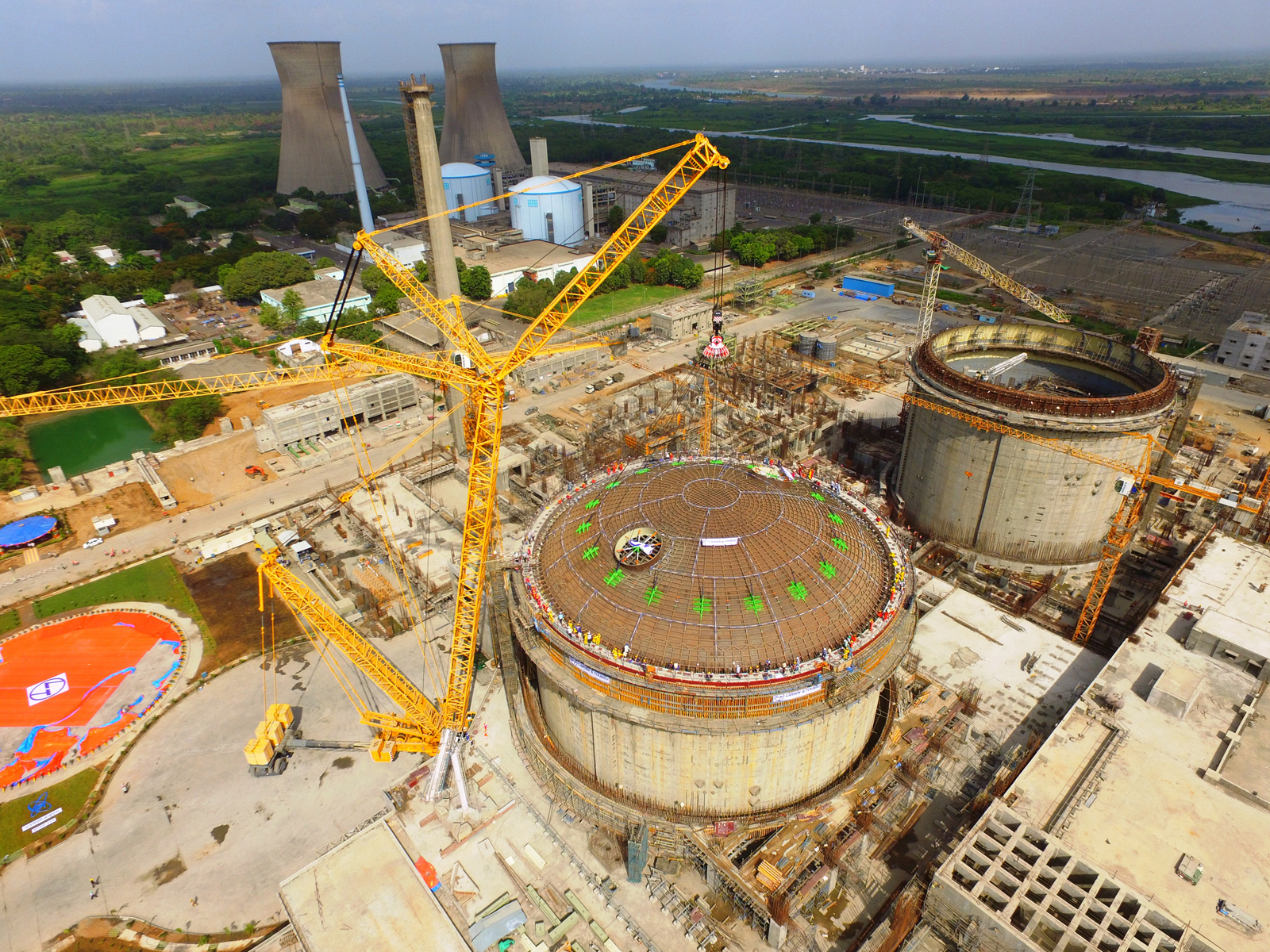
An IPHWR-700 reactor undergoing construction in Kakrapar Nuclear Plant started in 1984

Primary energy consumption of India is the third-largest after China and US with 5.3% global share in the year 2015. Coal and crude oil together account for 85% of the primary energy consumption of India. India's oil reserves meet 25% of the country's domestic oil demand. As of April 2025, India's total proven coal reserves stood at 400.72 billion tonnes (394,390 million long tons; 441,720 million short tons) crude oil reserves are 672.07 million tonnes (661.46 million long tons; 740.83 million short tons), and natural gas reserves stood at 1,073.01 billion cubic metres (37.893 trillion cubic feet). Oil and natural gas fields are located offshore at Ashoknagar Oil Field, Bombay High, Krishna Godavari Basin, Mangala Area and the Cauvery Delta, and onshore mainly in the states of West Bengal, Assam, Gujarat and Rajasthan. India is the fourth-largest consumer of oil and net oil imports were nearly ₹8.2 trillion (US$88 billion) in 2014–15, which had an adverse effect on the country's current account deficit.

The petroleum industry in India mostly consists of public sector companies such as Oil and Natural Gas Corporation (ONGC), Hindustan Petroleum Corporation Limited (HPCL), Bharat Petroleum Corporation Limited (BPCL) and Indian Oil Corporation Limited (IOCL). There are some major private Indian companies in the oil sector such as Reliance Industries Limited (RIL) which operates the world's largest oil refining complex at Jamnagar. In 2026, fuel costs rose after the Iran war disrupted Middle Eastern energy supplies, leading to higher LPG prices in India.

India became the world's third-largest producer of electricity in 2013 with a 4.8% global share in electricity generation, surpassing Japan and Russia. Renewable electricity generation reached 500.98 Twh (24.0% of total electricity generation) as of Feb 2026, making India the 4th largest producer of renewable electricity in the world.

=== Infrastructure ===
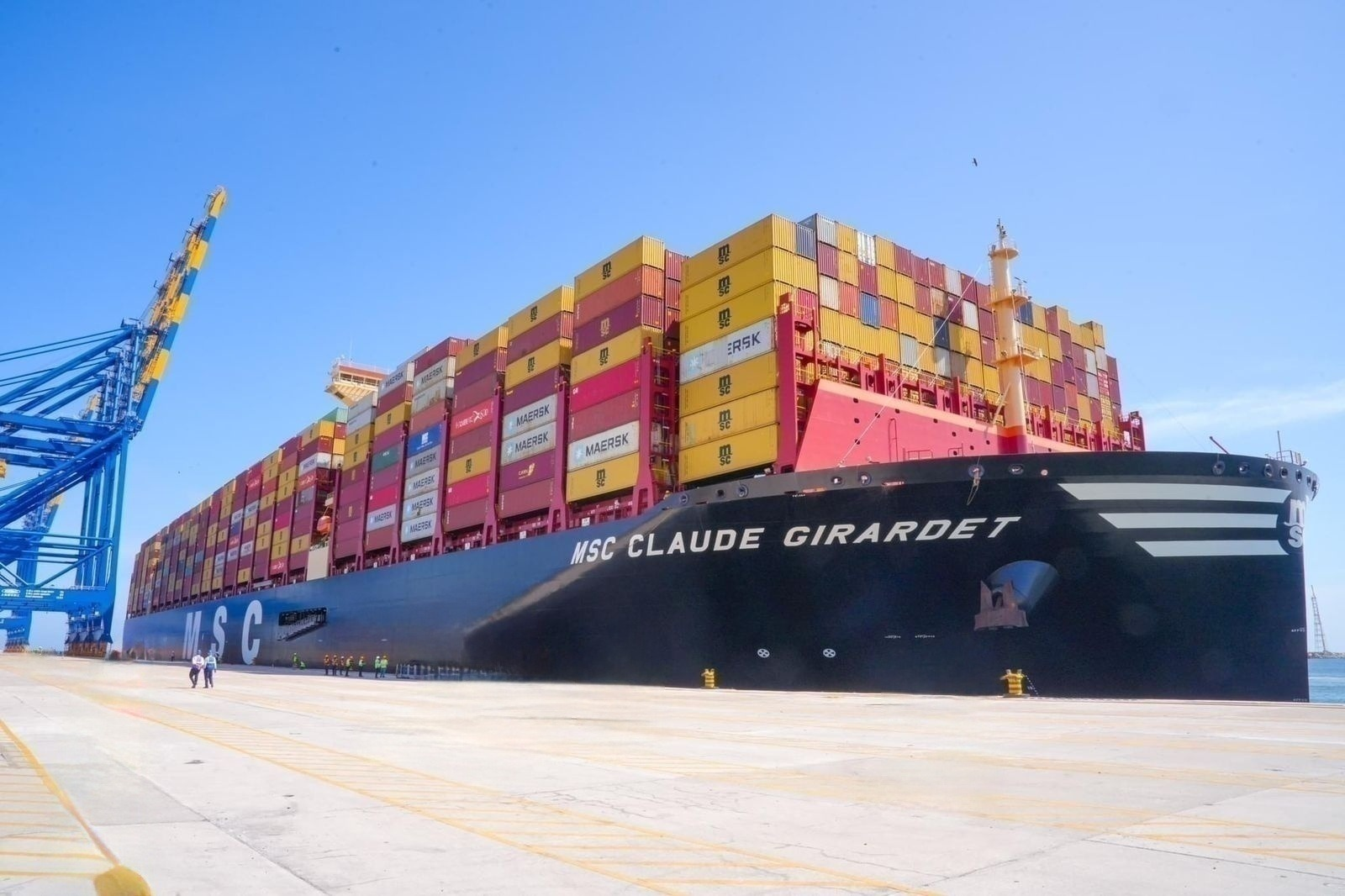
Vizhinjam International Seaport Thiruvananthapuram, the first Mother Port in the world, with harbour depth of 24 metres

India's infrastructure and transport sector contributes around 5% to the country's gross domestic product (GDP).

==== Roads ====
India's total road network is over 6.6 million km, making it the largest in the world as of 2025. This expansive network comprises national highways, state highways, and other roads and is crucial for transportation, with roads carrying over 85% of passenger traffic and more than 70% of freight.

India has rapidly expanded its network of expressways and national highways. As of 2024, more than 45,000 kilometres (28,000 mi) of 4-lane and above highways have been built, including flagship projects such as the Delhi–Mumbai Expressway, Surat–Chennai Expressway, Ganga Expressway, Dwarka Expressway, and Delhi–Meerut Expressway.

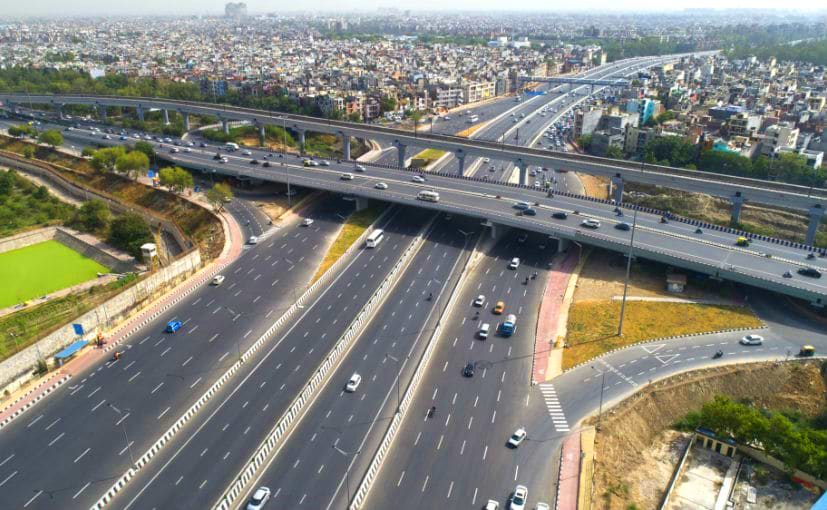
Delhi–Meerut Expressway is among the widest expressways in India

==== Ports ====
India has a coastline of 11,098.81 kilometres (6,896.48 mi), with 13 major ports and more than 200 non-major and private ports. These handle around 95% of India's external trade by volume and about 70% by value. Kandla (Deendayal) Port in Gujarat is the largest public port, while Mundra Port (operated by Adani Ports) is the largest private port in India. Under the Sagarmala project, port-led development and modernization of coastal infrastructure are being accelerated.

==== Airports ====
India currently has around 153 operational airports managed by the Airport Authority of India (AAI), including 29 international airports, 10 customs airports, and 114 domestic airports, along with 23 civil enclaves at defence airfields. This number reflects significant growth, as it was 74 in 2014 and has more than doubled, a result of government initiatives UDAN.

=== Construction and Real Estate ===
The construction sector—including infrastructure and real estate services—now accounts for approximately 18% of India's total economic output, reflecting a decade-long compound annual growth rate (CAGR) of about 11%. It remains the second-largest employment generator in the economy, currently employing roughly 71 million people and forecasted to exceed 100 million jobs by 2030. India is massively privatizing airports, ports, bus stands, railway stations, dams, dam wind park, solar parks, floating solar plants, power transmission, highways, thermal power and other utilizes.

=== Finance and trade ===
==== Banking and financial services ====
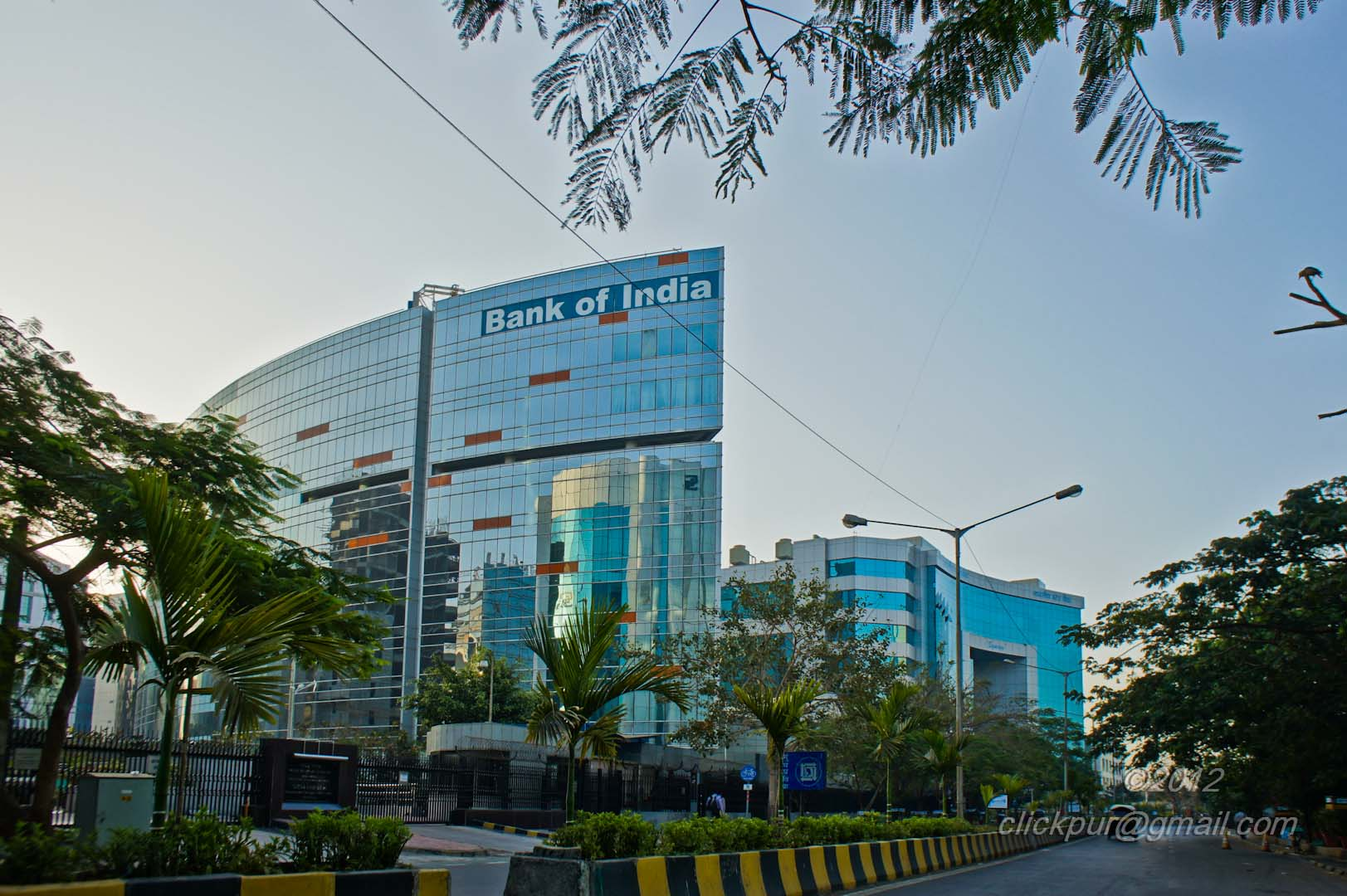
Bank of India HQ in BKC

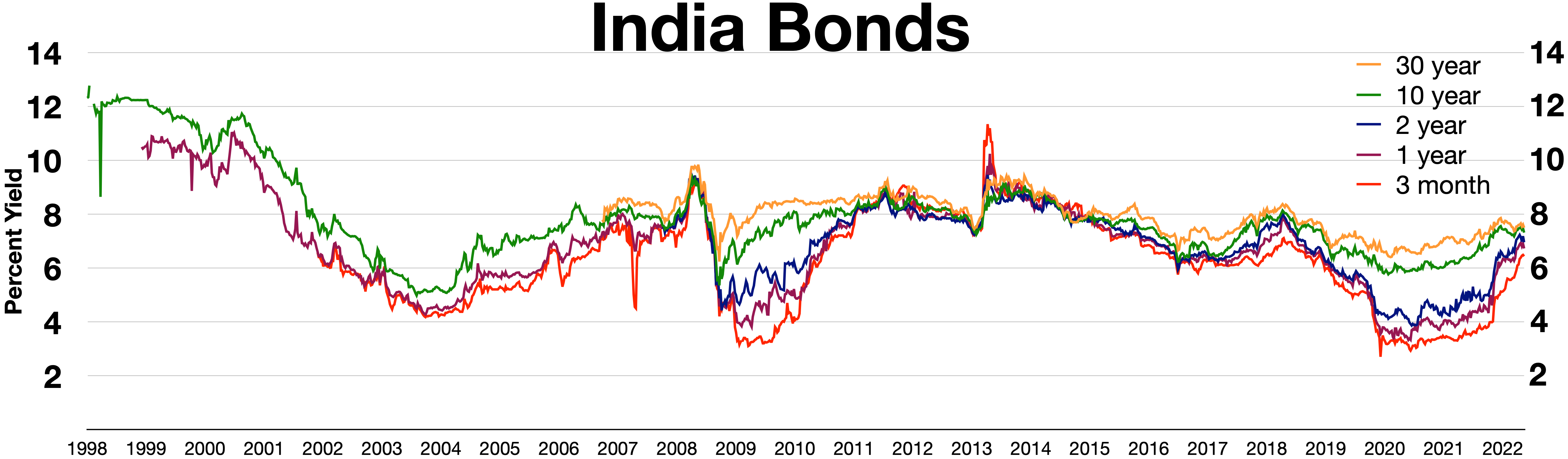
India bonds 30 year 10 year 2 year 1 year 3 month

The financial services industry contributed $809 billion (37% of GDP) and employed 14.17 million people (3% of the workforce) in 2016, and the banking sector contributed $407 billion (19% of GDP) and employed 5.5 million people (1% of the workforce) in 2016. The Indian money market is classified into the organised sector, comprising private, public and foreign-owned commercial banks and cooperative banks, together known as 'scheduled banks'; and the unorganised sector, which includes individual or family-owned indigenous bankers or money lenders and non-banking financial companies. The unorganised sector and microcredit are preferred over traditional banks in rural and sub-urban areas, especially for non-productive purposes such as short-term loans for ceremonies.

India's gross domestic savings in 2006–07 as a percentage of GDP stood at a high 32.8%. More than half of personal savings are invested in physical assets such as land, houses, cattle, and gold. The government-owned public-sector banks hold over 75% of total assets of the banking industry, with the private and foreign banks holding 18.2% and 6.5% respectively. Since liberalisation, the government has approved significant banking reforms. While some of these relate to nationalised banks – such as reforms encouraging mergers, reducing government interference and increasing profitability and competitiveness – other reforms have opened the banking and insurance sectors to private and foreign companies.

=== Retail ===
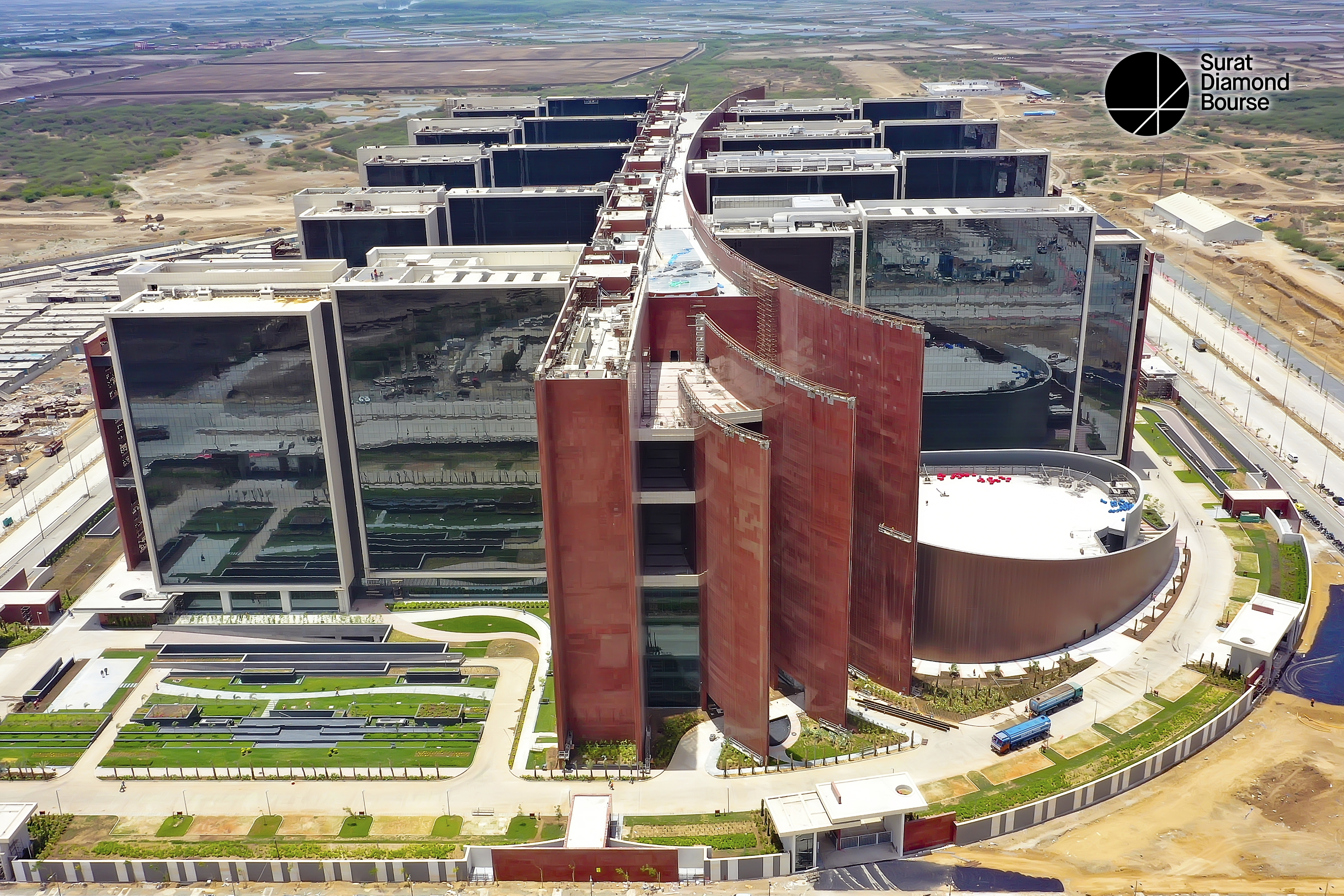
Surat Diamond City Aerial View

The retail industry, excluding wholesale, contributed $793 billion (10% of GDP) and employed 35 million people (8% of the workforce) in 2020. The industry is the second largest employer in India, after agriculture. The Indian retail market is estimated to be US$600 billion and one of the top-five retail markets in the world by economic value. India has one of the fastest-growing retail markets in the world, and is projected to reach $1.3 trillion by 2020. India has retail market worth $1.17 trillion, which contributes over 10% of India's GDP. It also has one of the world's fastest growing e-commerce markets. The e-commerce retail market in India was valued at $32.7 billion in 2018, and is expected to reach $71.9 billion by 2022.

=== Services ===
==== Tourism ====
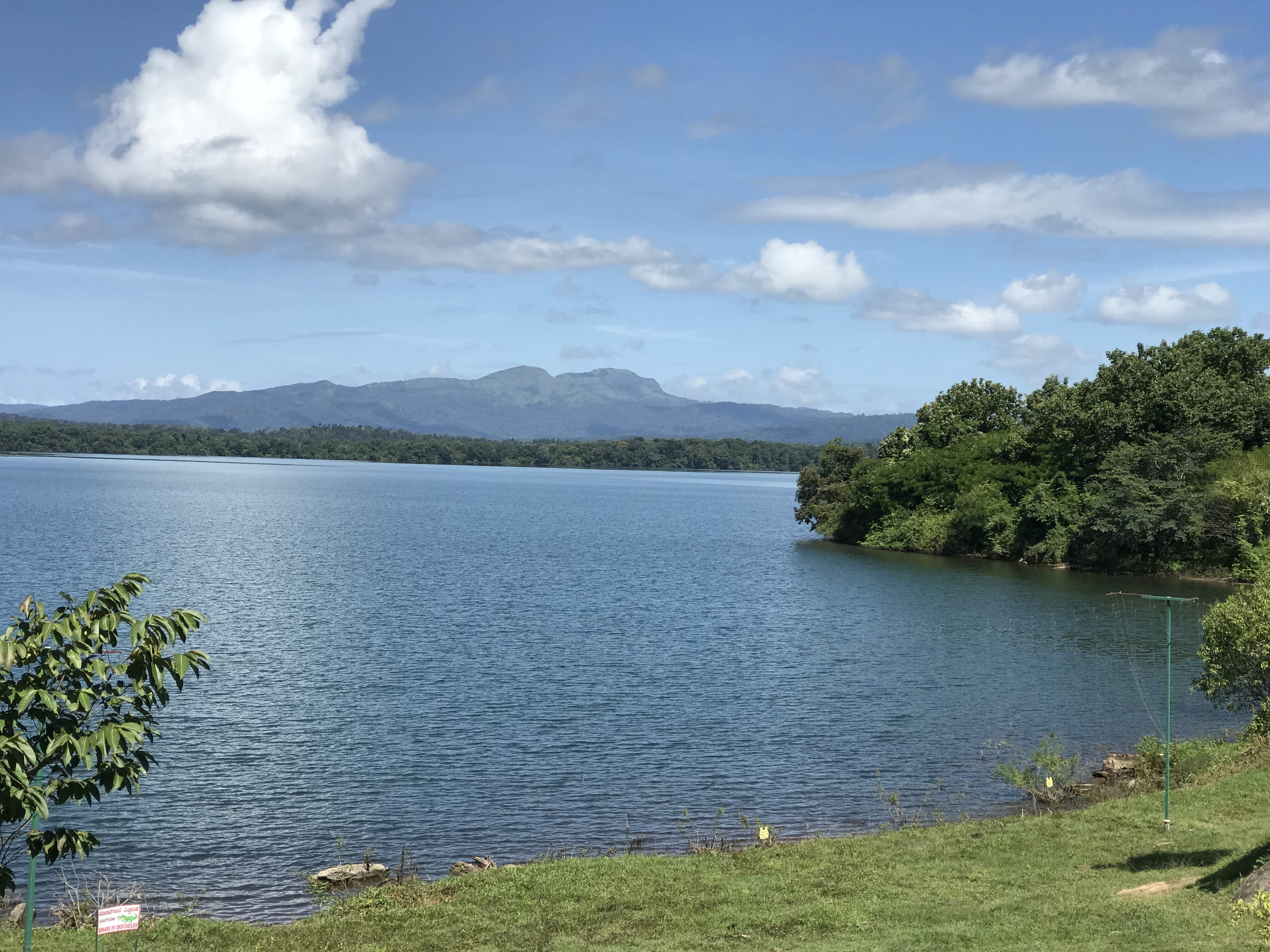
Scenic view from Harangi Elephant Camp & Tree Park in Coorg

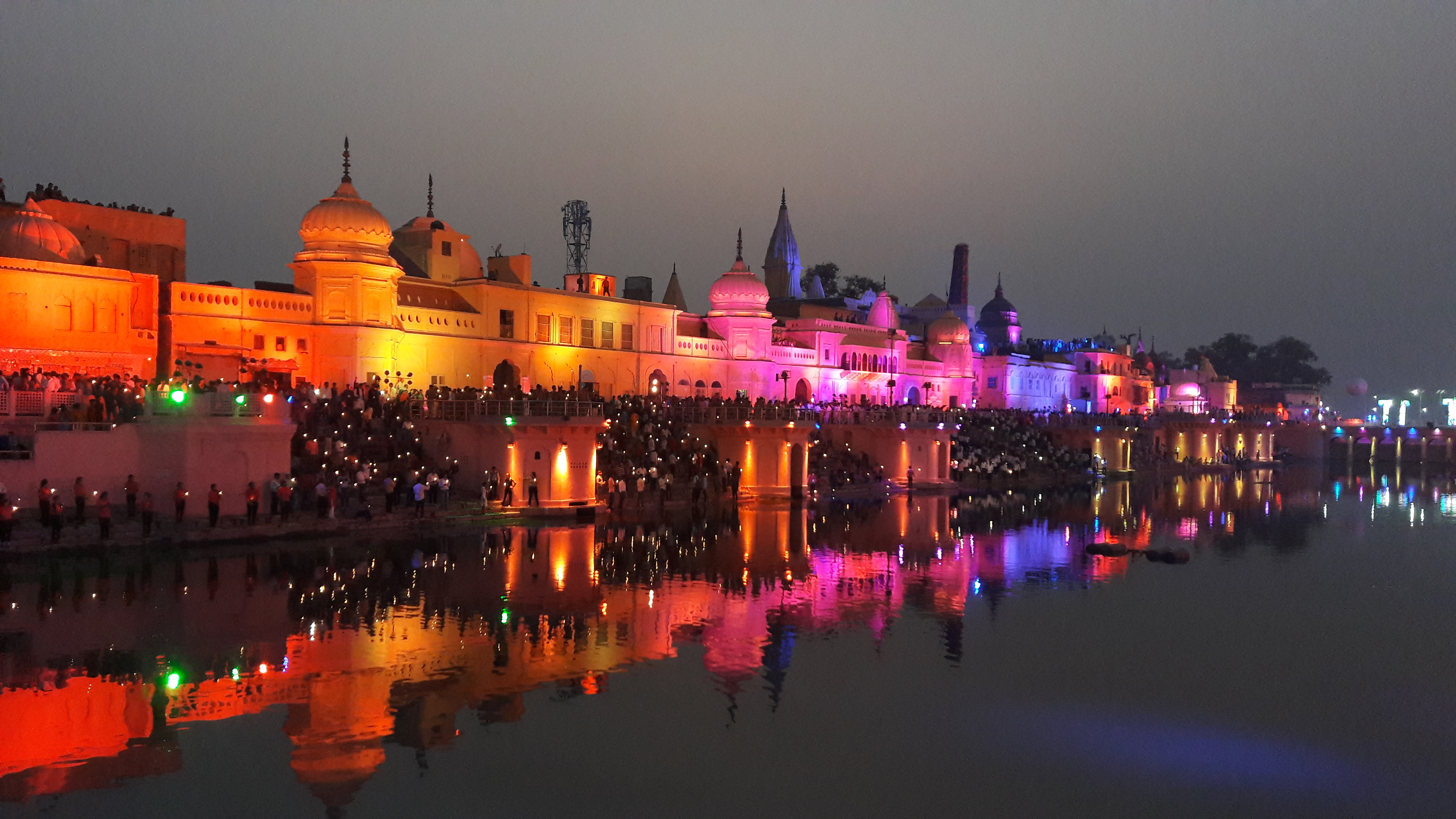
Ayodhya became the top destination of Uttar Pradesh in 2024

The World Travel & Tourism Council calculated that tourism generated ₹15.24 trillion (US$160 billion) or 9.4% of the nation's GDP in 2017 and supported 41.622 million jobs, 8% of its total employment. The sector is predicted to grow at an annual rate of 6.9% to ₹32.05 trillion (US$340 billion) by 2028 (9.9% of GDP). The tourism industry contributes about 9.2% of India's GDP and employs over 42 million people. India earned $21.07 billion in foreign exchange from tourism receipts in 2015. International tourism to India has seen a steady growth from 2.37 million arrivals in 1997 to 8.03 million arrivals in 2015. Bangladesh is the largest source of international tourists to India, while European Union nations and Japan are other major sources of international tourists. Over 12 million Indian citizens take international trips each year for tourism, while domestic tourism within India adds about 740 million Indian travellers.

India has a fast-growing medical tourism sector of its health care economy, offering low-cost health services and long-term care. In October 2015, the medical tourism sector was estimated to be worth US$3 billion. It is projected to grow to $7–8 billion by 2020. In 2014, 184,298 foreign patients traveled to India to seek medical treatment.

==== Films, entertainment and music industry ====
The Indian cinema industry is expected to garner a revenue of around Rs 16,198 crore by 2026, of which Rs 15,849 would be Box office revenue and the rest Rs 349 crore from advertising, the report added. India's Recorded Music industry (which is a key sub-segment) is making steady progress at a CAGR of 13.6 percent, thanks to streaming models.

== Employment ==
India: extreme poverty rates from 1977 to 2023

As of 2022–23, around 46% of India's workforce was employed in the agricultural sector. This share, which had declined before the pandemic, has risen again in recent years, reaching 46.1% in 2023–24. During the same period, the services sector (excluding agriculture) accounted for about 28.9 percent of employment in 2022–23. The share of manufacturing employment has been more modest 11.4% in 2023–24. In 2021–22 and 2022–23, MoSPI reported that the unorganised non-farm sector employed about 19% of India's workforce while contributing only 6% of GDP. Other labour-market estimates indicate that the organised sector accounts for roughly 7% of the total workforce, with the remaining 93% in various forms of unorganised employment. Although India's labour productivity is lower than advanced economies, it aligns with levels observed in many emerging Asian countries like China. As of 2023–24, there remains a significant gender gap in employment. In rural areas, 73.5% of working women were self-employed, compared to 59.4% of rural men. In urban areas, 42.3% of women were self-employed versus 39.8% of men. The share of women in regular wage or salaried jobs was only 15.9%. Female labour force participation was 30.5% in rural areas and 20.2% in urban areas, compared to 55.5% and 58.3% for men, respectively. Gender earnings gaps persist: rural female casual labourers earned ₹259 per day, compared to ₹437 per day for rural male casual labourers, although much of this difference may reflect the types of jobs and occupations they engage in rather than direct pay discrimination.

=== Unemployment ===
Unemployment in India remains a complex challenge despite signs of modest improvement. According to the Periodic Labour Force Survey (PLFS) for 2024, the joblessness rate for persons aged 15 and above dipped slightly to 4.9%, down from 5.0% in 2023, while the Labour force participation rate (LFPR) remained broadly stable at about 56.2%. In April 2025, India's first monthly labour-force survey showed an unemployment rate of 5.1%, with an LFPR of 55.6%. However, urban unemployment continues to be more pronounced, reaching around 6.4% in the October–December 2024 quarter, with notably higher rates among women (8.1%) than men (5.8%).

Structural issues still persist. A large share of India's workforce is self-employed (57.3%) and many are unpaid helpers in household enterprises (18.3%), which suggests under-employment and disguised employment remain widespread. Critics also point to limitations in how unemployment is measured. For example, some argue that definitions used by the PLFS count even minimal economic activity (such as one hour of work per week) as "employed", potentially understating the real scale of joblessness.

=== Child labour ===
Child labour is a complex problem that is rooted in poverty. Since the 1990s, the government has implemented a variety of programs to eliminate child labour. These have included setting up schools, launching free school lunch programs, creating special investigation cells, etc. Author Sonalde Desai stated that recent studies on child labour in India have found some pockets of industries in which children are employed, but overall, relatively few Indian children are employed. Child labour below the age of 10 is now rare. In the 10–14 age group, the latest surveys find only 2% of children working for wage, while another 9% work within their home or rural farms assisting their parents in times of high work demand such as sowing and harvesting of crops.

=== Diaspora remittance ===
India has the largest diaspora around the world, an estimated 32 million people according to the Ministry of External Affairs (India), many of whom work overseas and remit funds back to their families. The Middle East region is the largest source of employment for expat Indians. The crude oil production and infrastructure industry of Saudi Arabia employs over 2 million expat Indians. Cities such as Dubai and Abu Dhabi in United Arab Emirates have employed another 2 million Indians during the construction boom in recent decades.

=== Trade unions ===
In India, the Trade Union movement is generally divided on political lines. According to provisional statistics from the Ministry of Labour, trade unions had a combined membership of 24,601,589 in 2002. As of 2008, there are 12 Central Trade Union Organisations (CTUO) recognized by the Ministry of Labour. The forming of these unions was a big deal in India. It led to a big push for more regulatory laws which gave workers a lot more power.

== Income and consumption ==
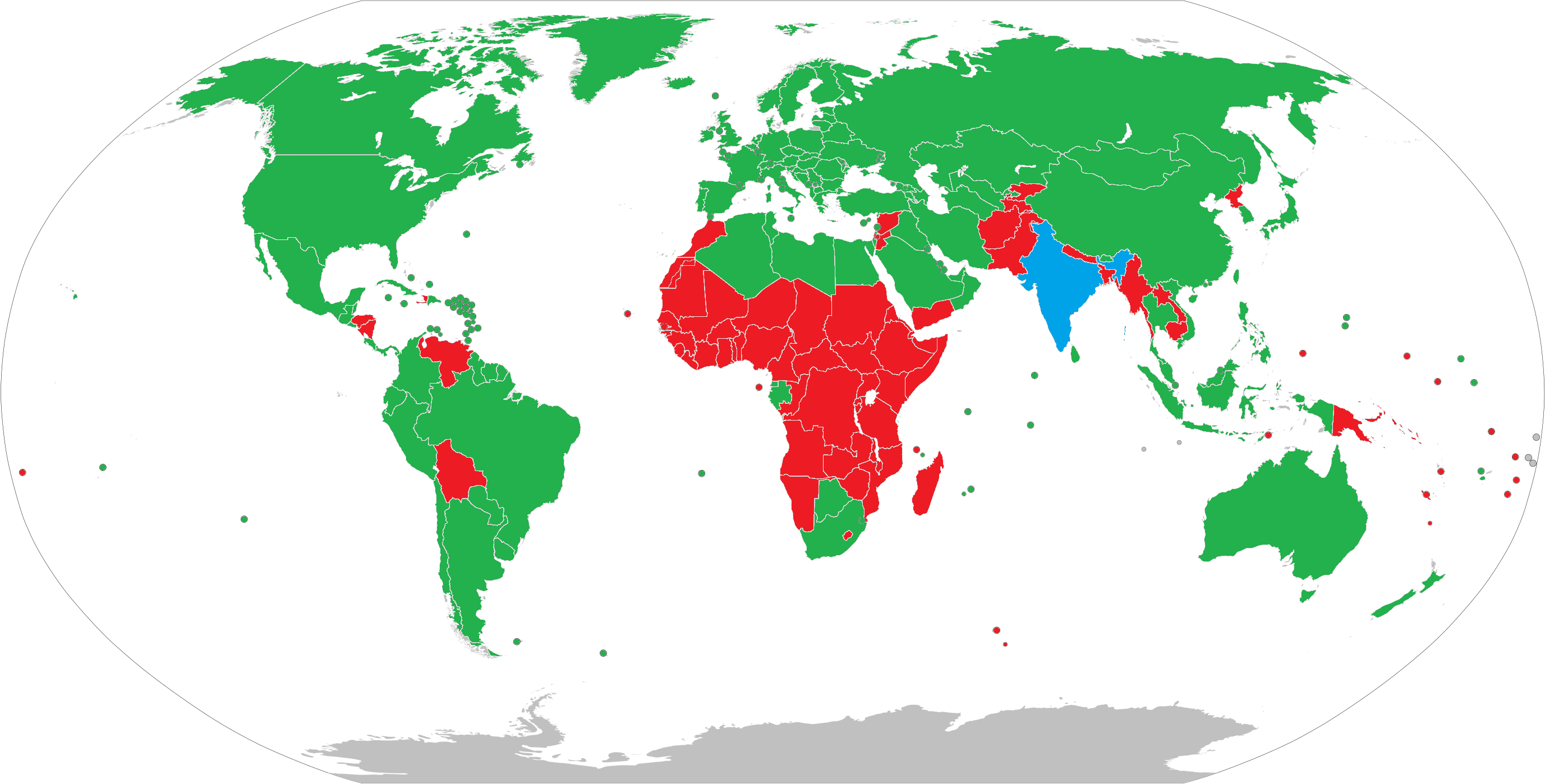
India vs world by GDP per capita adjusted for PPP in 2026 India Less than India More than India

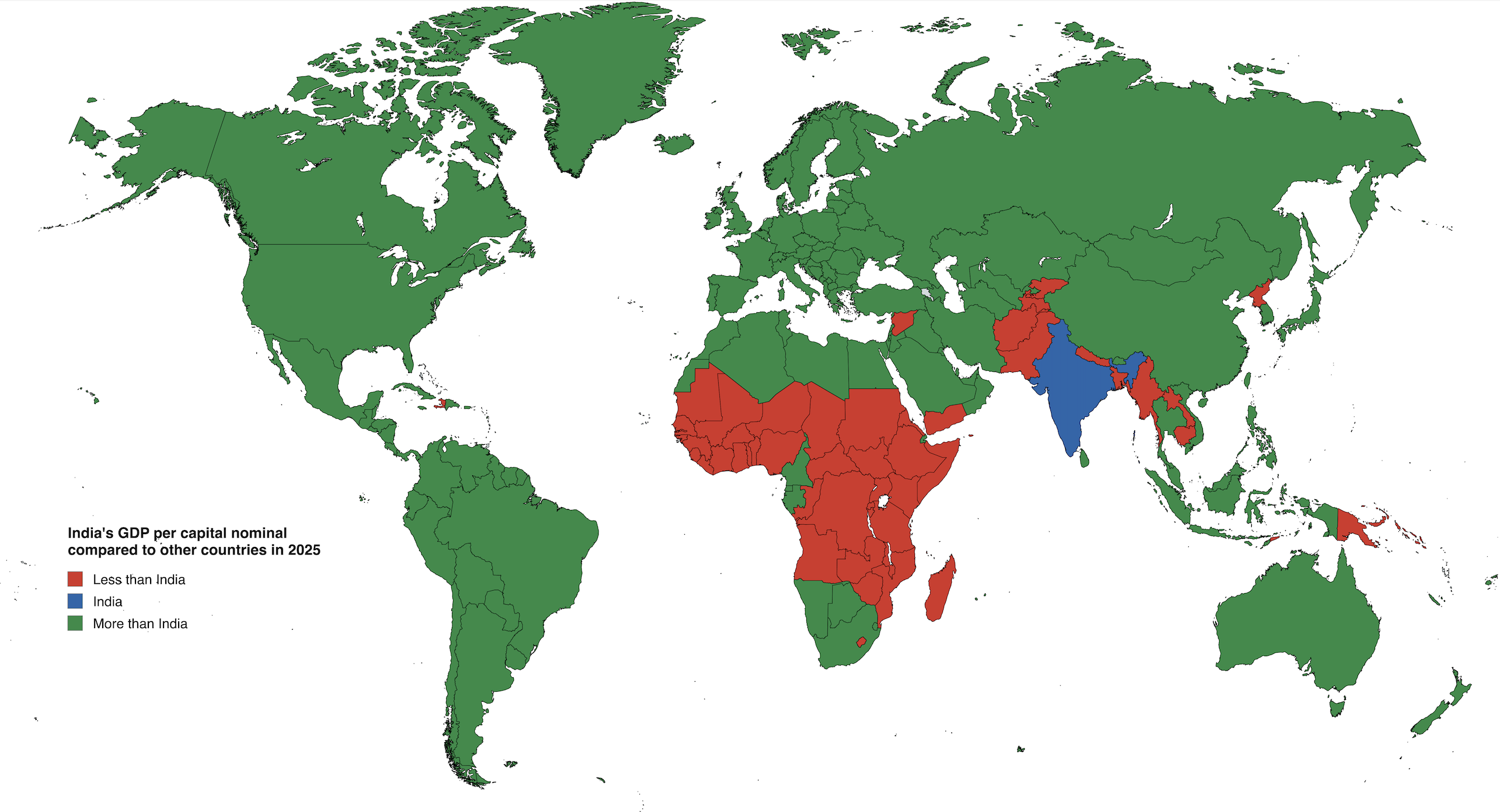
India vs world by nominal GDP per capita in 2025

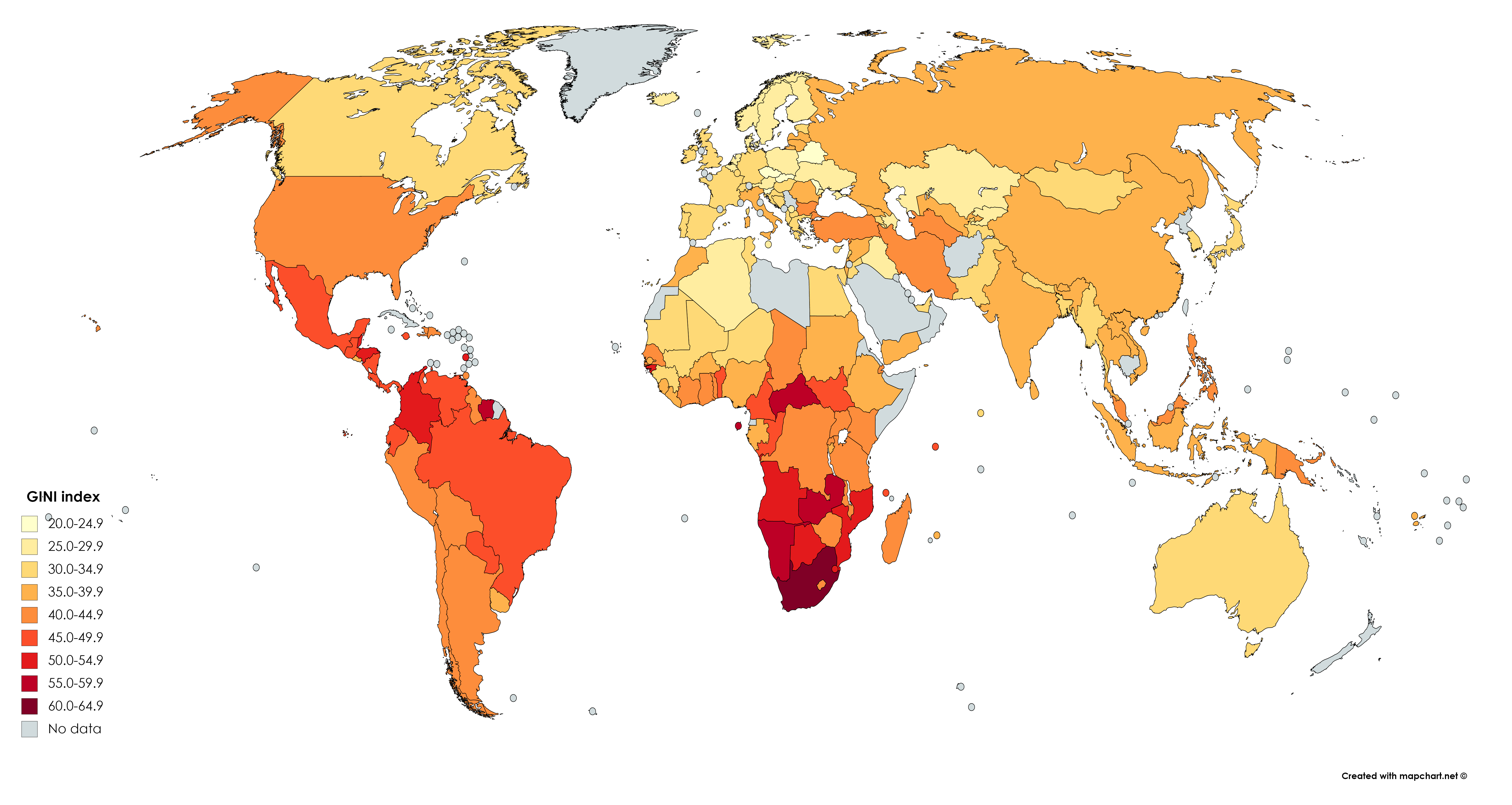
Gini index of India compared to other countries per World Bank data tables as of 2018

India's gross national income per capita had experienced high growth rates since 2002. It has increased from ₹19,040 in 2002–03 to ₹1,88,892 in 2024. This translates to approximately $2,268. India's GNI per capita has seen considerable growth in the last 10 years. While specific average growth rates are not consistently reported, the available data indicates a positive trend. For example, India's GNI per capita increased by 6.72% in 2023, reaching $2,540. In comparison, the per capita income at constant (2011–12) prices increased by 35.12% between 2014–15 and 2022–23. This indicates a positive trend in both nominal and real terms. The estimated GNI per capita for India in 2025 is $2,878 (nominal) at current prices, according to the IMF World Economic Outlook.

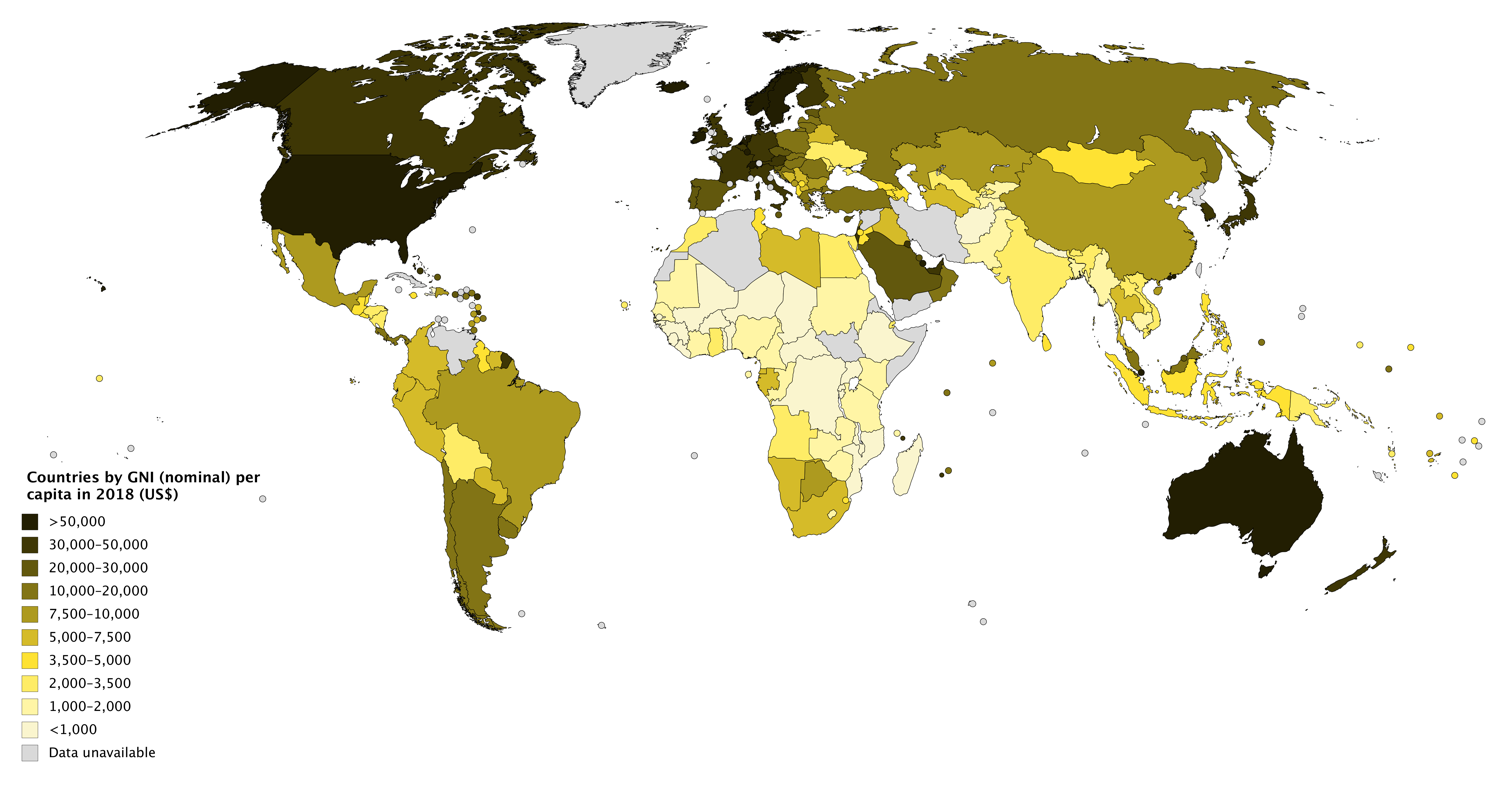
Countries by nominal GNI per capita according to the Atlas method (2018)

=== Income inequality ===
Wealth distribution in India is uneven, but less extreme than in some developed countries. As of 2022–23, the top 1% of Indians held about 40.1% of the country's total wealth, while the top 10% accounted for roughly 57–60% of national income. Although wealth is concentrated among the richest segments, India's inequality is lower than in countries such as the United States, Japan, and the United Kingdom. Inequality worsened since the establishment of income tax in 1922, overtaking the British Raj's record of the share of the top 1% in national income, which was 20.7% in 1939–40.

=== Poverty ===
Poverty rate map of India by prevalence in 2012, among its states and union territories

In May 2014, the World Bank reviewed and proposed revisions to its poverty calculation methodology of 2005 and purchasing-power-parity basis for measuring poverty. According to the revised methodology, the world had 872.3 million people below the new poverty line, of which 179.6 million lived in India. With 17.5% of the total world's population, India had a 20.6% share of the world's poorest in 2013. According to a 2005–2006 survey, India had about 61 million children under the age of 5 who were chronically malnourished. A 2011 UNICEF report stated that between 1990 and 2010, India achieved a 45 percent reduction in mortality rates under the age of 5, and now ranks 46th of 188 countries on this metric.

Since the early 1960s, successive governments have implemented various schemes to alleviate poverty, under central planning, that have met with partial success. In 2005, the government enacted the Mahatma Gandhi National Rural Employment Guarantee Act (MGNREGA), guaranteeing 100 days of minimum wage employment to every rural household in all the districts of India. In 2011, it was widely criticised and beset with controversy for corrupt officials, deficit financing as the source of funds, poor quality of infrastructure built under the programme, and unintended destructive effects. Other studies suggest that the programme has helped reduce rural poverty in some cases. Yet other studies report that India's economic growth has been the driver of sustainable employment and poverty reduction, though a sizeable population remains in poverty. India lifted 271 million people out of poverty between 2006 and 2016, recording the fastest reductions in the multidimensional poverty index values during the period with strong improvements in areas such as assets, cooking fuel, sanitation, and nutrition.

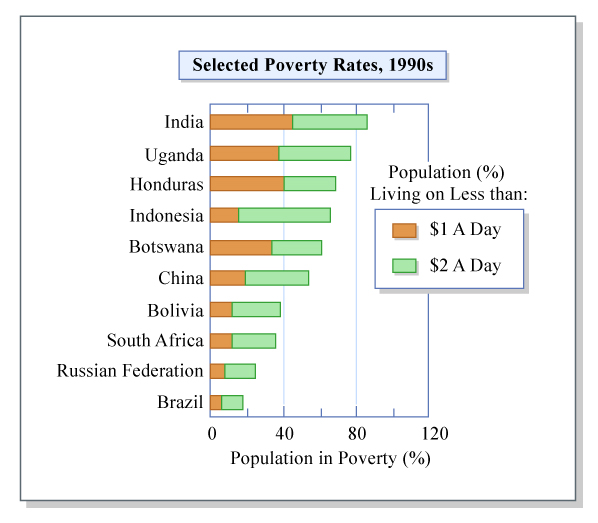
Graph of selected poverty rates in the 1990s.

On the 2019 Global Hunger Index India ranked 102nd (out of 117 countries) with a score of 30.3, being categorized as 'serious' in severity. In 2024, India ranked 105 (out of 127 countries) with a score of 27.3, indicating an improvement in its hunger situation.

According to the World Bank's Spring 2025 Poverty and Equity Brief, approximately 171 million people in India moved out of extreme poverty between 2011 and 2023. During this period, the country's poverty rate declined significantly from 16.2% to 2.3%, based on the international poverty line of $2.15 per day.

== Budget, fiscal policy, and taxation ==
Taxes in India are levied by the central and state governments under powers conferred by the Constitution of India; local bodies such as municipalities and panchayats may levy some minor taxes, mainly property tax. Article 265 of the Constitution provides that "No tax shall be levied or collected except by the authority of law". So, the Parliament or a State Legislature must have a law in force to collect taxes.

The main central taxes are income tax on individuals and companies, governed since 1 April 2026 by the Income-Tax Act, 2025, and customs duty. The Goods and Services Tax (GST), introduced in 2017, is levied jointly by the central and state governments. The Constitution of India outlines the taxation powers of the centre and the states. In 2025-26, the central government collected ₹2,340,406 crore (US$250 billion) in net direct taxes, according to provisional data released by the Central Board of Direct Taxes. Combined central and state tax revenue is 19.6% of GDP.

The system has been criticised for its complexity, frequent amendments, high litigation volume, retrospective taxation, and high tariffs; successive governments have tried to simplify laws and enact administrative reforms while combating evasion.

== Currency ==
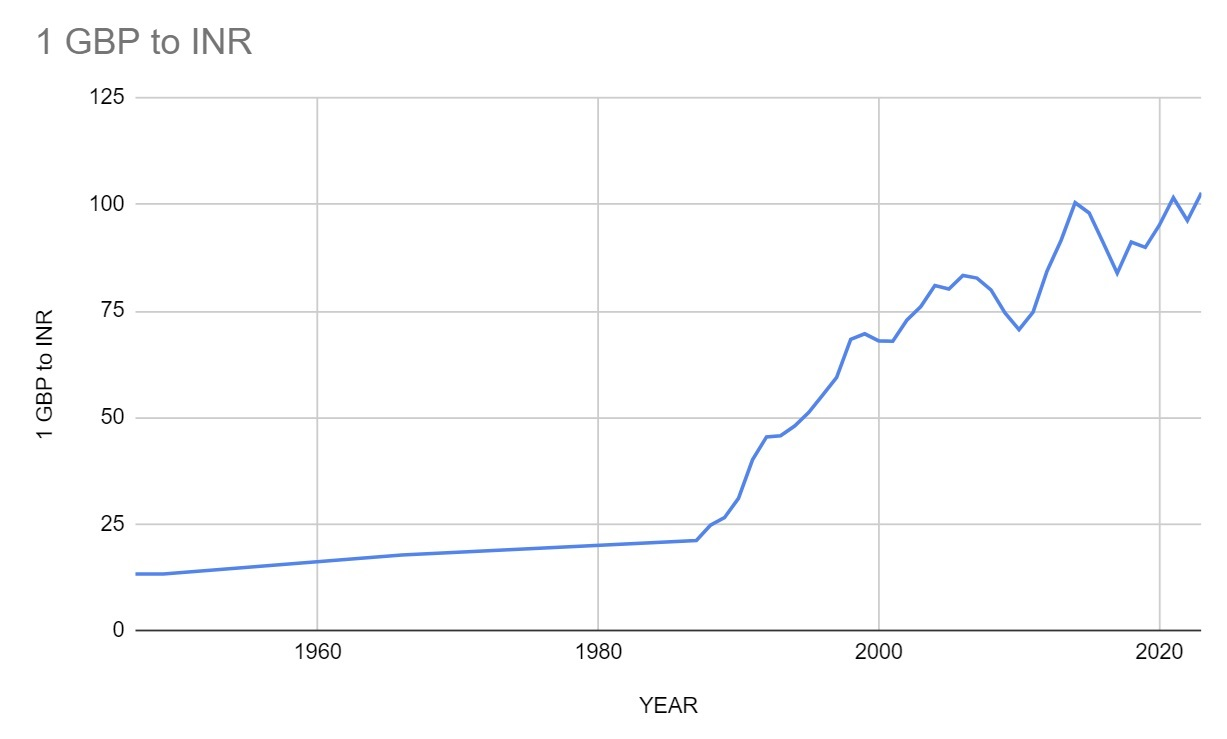
Graph of GBP's value against INR (1947 to 2025)

The Indian rupee (₹) is the only legal tender in India, and is also accepted as legal tender in neighbouring Nepal and Bhutan, both of which peg their currency to that of the Indian rupee. The rupee previously was divided into 100 paise, which no longer exist for public use. The highest-denomination banknote was the ₹2,000 note until 30 September 2023 after which it was scrapped and ₹500 note became the highest denomination; the lowest-denomination coin in circulation is the ₹1 coin. In 2017, demonetisation was announced in which ₹500 and ₹1000 notes were withdrawn and new ₹500 notes were issued. India's monetary system is managed by the Reserve Bank of India (RBI), the country's central bank.

== Security markets ==
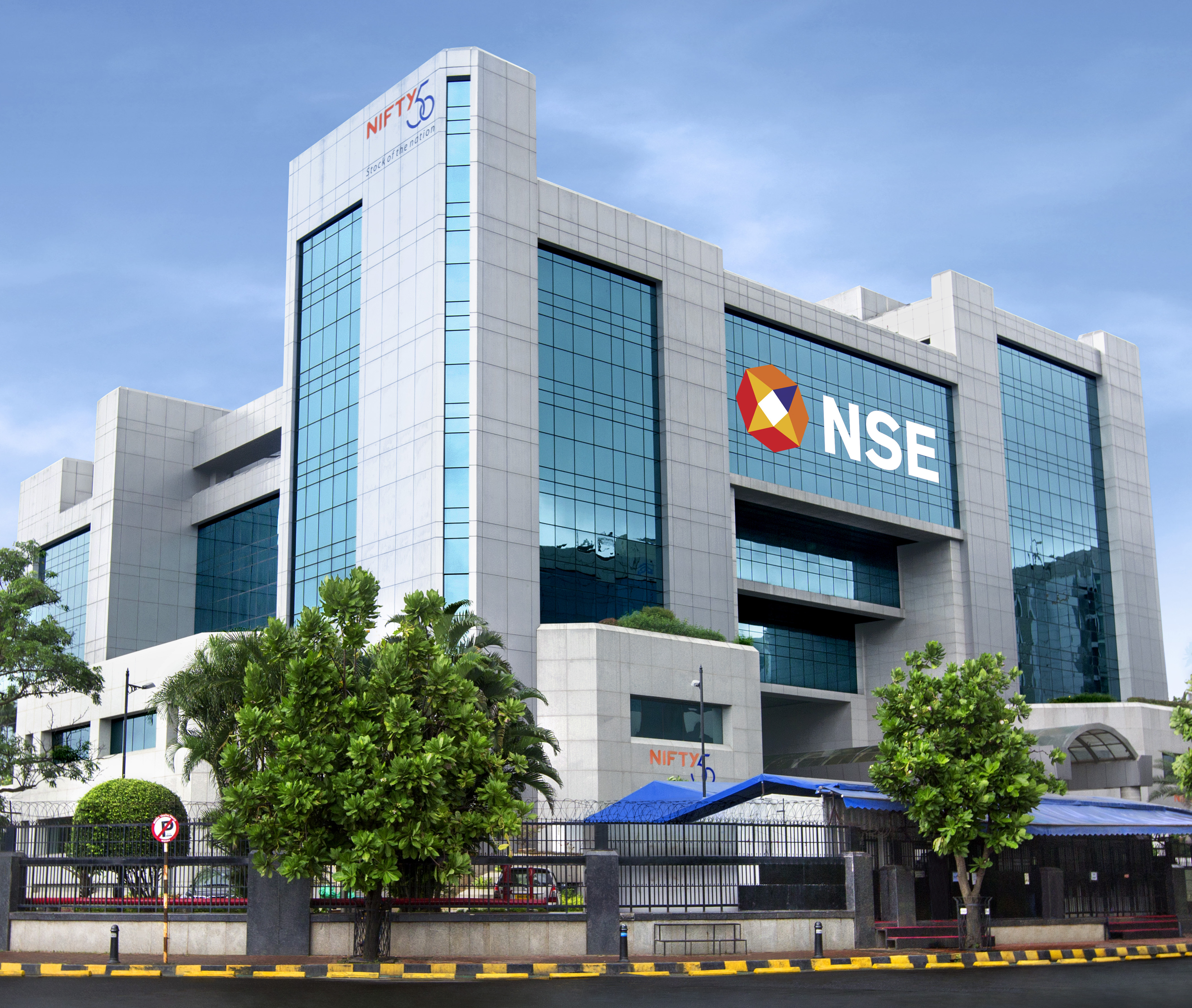
The National Stock Exchange of India (NSE) is the biggest stock exchange in India by trading volume as 96% trading occurs in NSE

The development of Indian security markets began with the launch of the Bombay Stock Exchange (BSE) in July 1875 and the Ahmedabad Stock Exchange in 1894. Since then, 22 other exchanges have traded in Indian cities. In 2014, India's stock exchange market became the 10th largest in the world by market capitalisation, just above those of South Korea and Australia. India's two major stock exchanges, BSE and the National Stock Exchange of India, had a market capitalisation of US$1.71 trillion and US$1.68 trillion as of February 2015, according to the World Federation of Exchanges, which grew to $3.36 trillion and $3.31 trillion respectively by September 2021.

The initial public offering (IPO) market in India has been small compared to NYSE and NASDAQ, raising US$300 million in 2013 and US$1.4 billion in 2012. Ernst & Young stated that the low IPO activity reflects market conditions, slow government approval processes, and complex regulations. Before 2013, Indian companies were not allowed to list their securities internationally without first completing an IPO in India. In 2013, these security laws were reformed and Indian companies can now choose where they want to list first: overseas, domestically, or both concurrently. Further, security laws have been revised to ease overseas listings of already-listed companies, to increase liquidity for private equity and international investors in Indian companies.

== Foreign trade and investment ==
=== Foreign trade ===
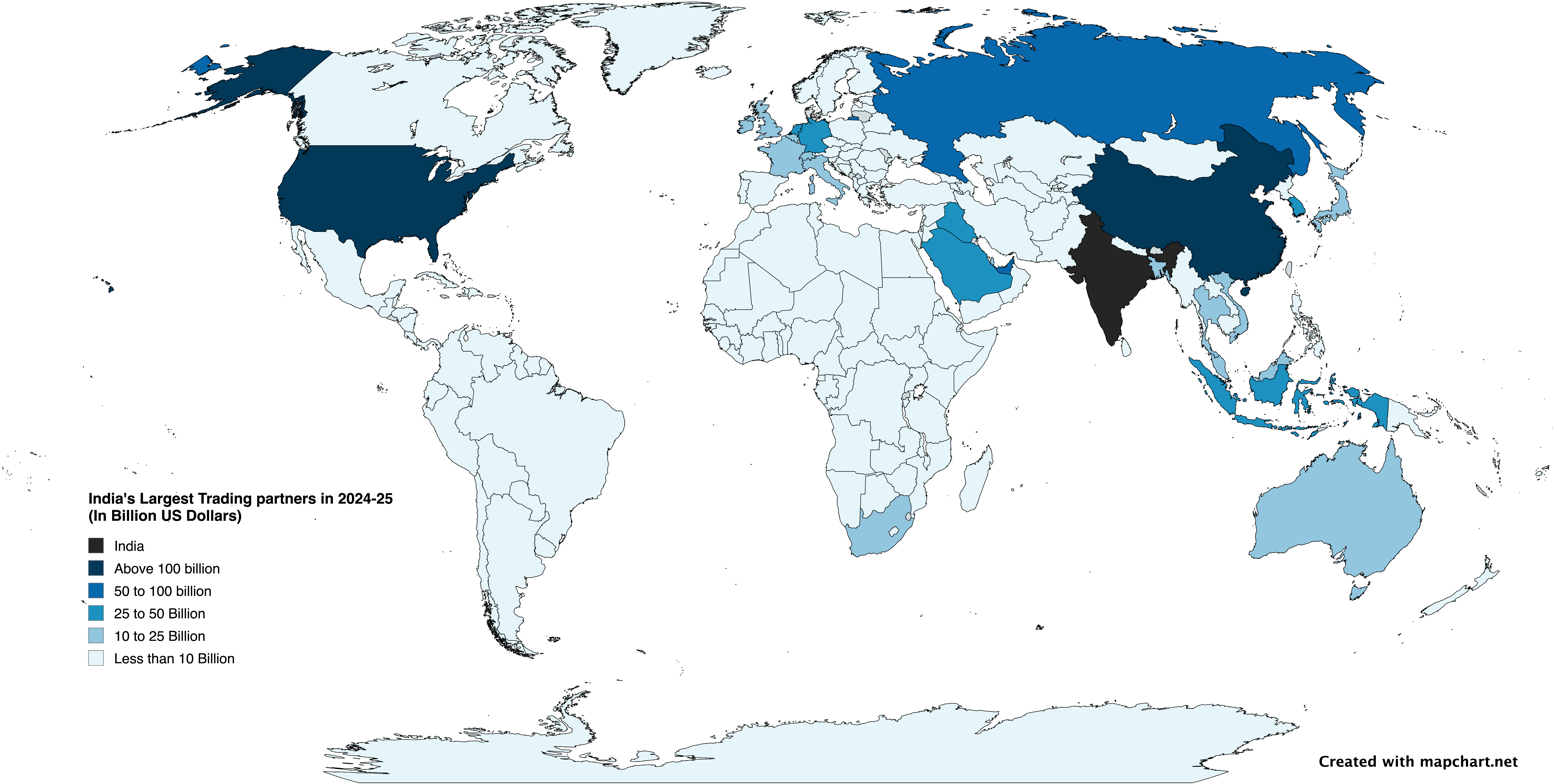
India's main trading partners in FY 2024–25. For the 2025–26 financial year, India's cumulative exports (merchandise and services) reached approximately US$863 billion.

==== India's foreign trade by year ====
| Year | Total Trade (in USD billion) | Exports (in USD billion) | Imports (in USD billion) | Trade Deficit (in USD billion) |
|---|---|---|---|---|
| 2024 | 1,631.48 | 776.68 | 854.80 | -78.12 |
| 2023 | 1,662.36 | 770.18 | 892.18 | -122.00 |
| 2022 | 1,436.59 | 676.53 | 760.06 | -83.53 |
| 2021 | 1,032 | 420 | 612 | -192.00 |
| 2020 | 781.5 | 314.31 | 467.19 | -158.88 |
| 2019 | 844.14 | 330.07 | 514.07 | -184 |
| 2018 | 769.1 | 303.52 | 465.58 | -162.05 |
| 2017 | 660.1 | 275.8 | 384.3 | -108.5 |
| 2016 | 643.3 | 262.3 | 381 | -118.7 |
| 2015 | 758.2 | 310.3 | 447.9 | -137.6 |
| 2014 | 781.1 | 318.2 | 462.9 | -144.7 |
| 2013 | 780.7 | 313.2 | 467.5 | -154.3 |
| 2012 | 798.8 | 298.4 | 500.4 | -202.0 |
| 2011 | 760.8 | 299.4 | 461.4 | -162.0 |
| 2010 | 528.1 | 201.1 | 327.0 | -125.9 |
| 2009 | 442.5 | 168.2 | 274.3 | -106.1 |
| 2008 | 481.9 | 176.4 | 305.5 | -129.1 |
| 2007 | 212.9 | 112.0 | 100.9 | 11.1 |
| 2006 | 189.33 | 76.23 | 113.1 | -36.87 |
| 2005 | 158.51 | 69.18 | 89.33 | -20.15 |
| 2004 | 131.39 | 57.24 | 74.15 | -16.91 |
| 2003 | 109.9 | 48.3 | 61.6 | -13.3 |
| 2002 | 98.3 | 44.5 | 53.8 | -9.3 |
| 2001 | 97 | 42.5 | 54.5 | -12.0 |
| 2000 | 103.9 | 43.1 | 60.8 | -17.7 |
| 1999 | 86.5 | 36.3 | 50.2 | -13.9 |

Until the liberalisation of 1991, India was largely and intentionally isolated from world markets, to protect its economy and to achieve self-reliance. Foreign trade was subject to import tariffs, export taxes and quantitative restrictions, while foreign direct investment (FDI) was restricted by upper-limit equity participation, restrictions on technology transfer, export obligations and government approvals; these approvals were needed for nearly 60% of new FDI in the industrial sector. The restrictions ensured that FDI averaged only around $200 million annually between 1985 and 1991; a large percentage of the capital flows consisted of foreign aid, commercial borrowing and deposits of non-resident Indians. India's exports were stagnant for the first 15 years after independence, due to general neglect of trade policy by the government of that period; imports in the same period, with early industrialisation, consisted predominantly of machinery, raw materials and consumer goods. Since liberalisation, the value of India's international trade has increased sharply, with the contribution of total trade in goods and services to the GDP rising from 16% in 1990–91 to 47% in 2009–10.

=== Balance of payments ===
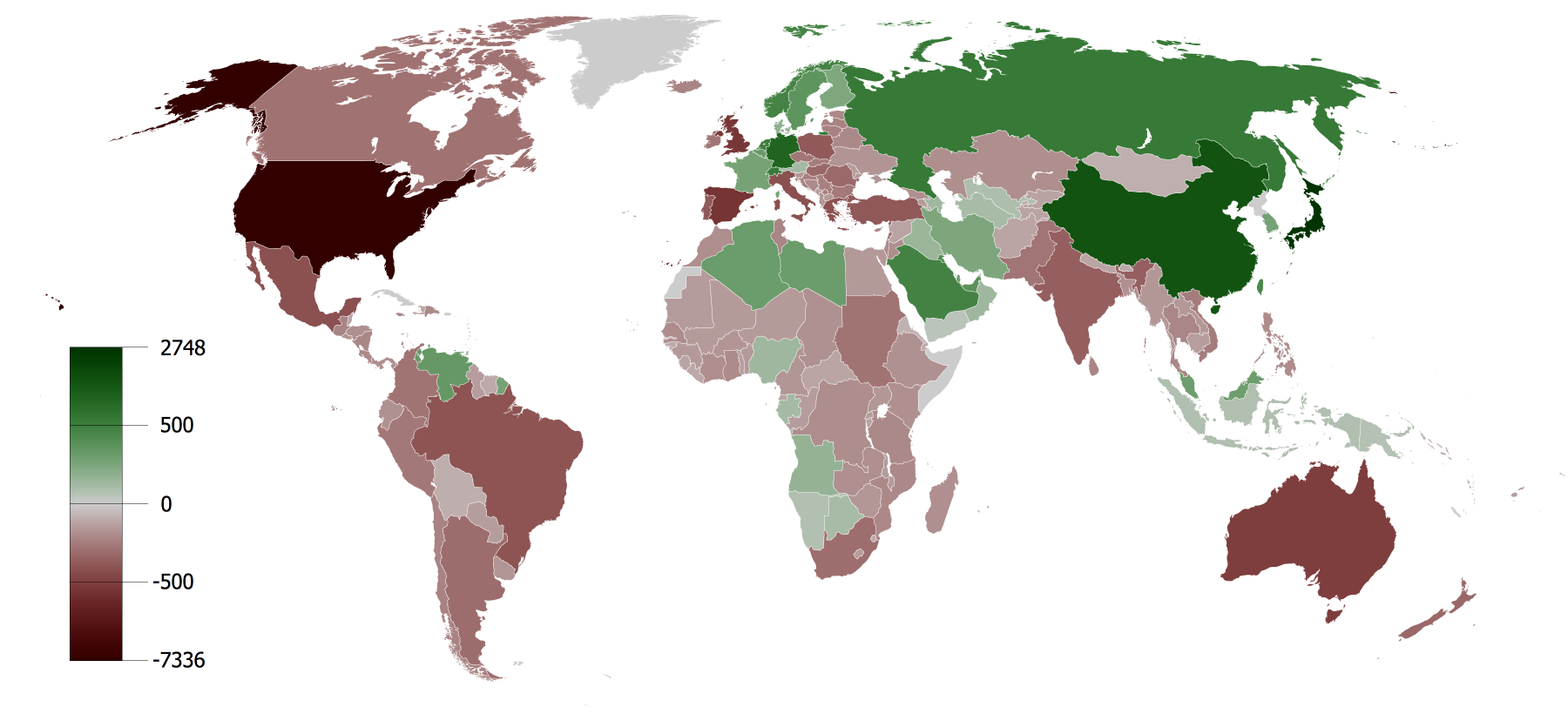
Cumulative current account balance 1980–2008 based on IMF data

Since independence, India's balance of payments on its current account has been negative. Since economic liberalisation in the 1990s, precipitated by a balance-of-payment crisis, India's exports rose consistently, covering 80.3% of its imports in 2002–03, up from 66.2% in 1990–91.

=== Foreign direct investment ===
As the third-largest economy in the world in PPP terms, India has attracted foreign direct investment (FDI). During the year 2011, FDI inflow into India stood at $36.5 billion, 51.1% higher than the 2010 figure of $24.15 billion. India has strengths in telecommunication, information technology and other significant areas such as auto components, chemicals, apparels, pharmaceuticals, and jewellery. Despite a surge in foreign investments, rigid FDI policies were a significant hindrance. Over time, India has adopted a number of FDI reforms. India has a large pool of skilled managerial and technical expertise. The size of the middle-class population stands at 300 million and represents a growing consumer market.

==== Outflows ====
Since 2000, Indian companies have expanded overseas, investing FDI and creating jobs outside India. From 2006 to 2010, FDI by Indian companies outside India amounted to 1.34 per cent of its GDP. Indian companies have deployed FDI and started operations in the United States, Europe and Africa. The Indian conglomerate Tata Group is United Kingdom's largest manufacturer and private-sector employer.

=== Remittances ===
In 2015, a total of US$68.91 billion was made in remittances to India from other countries, and a total of US$8.476 billion was made in remittances by foreign workers in India to their home countries. UAE, US, and Saudi Arabia were the top sources of remittances to India, while Bangladesh, Pakistan, and Nepal were the top recipients of remittances from India. Remittances to India accounted for 3.32% of the country's GDP in 2015.

According to the International Fund for Agricultural Development, India received a total of $150.7 billion in remittances in 2025, making it the world’s largest recipient of remittances. The United States was India’s largest remittance source, contributing 27.7% of inflows in 2023–24, according to the Reserve Bank of India.

== Economic issues ==
=== Corruption ===
A map depicting Corruption Perceptions Index in other countries as compared to India in 2023; a higher score indicates lower levels of corruption 100 – 90 89 – 80 79 – 70 69 – 60 59 – 50 49 – 40 39 – 30 29 – 20 19 – 10 9 – 0 No data

Corruption has been a pervasive problem in India. A 2005 study by Transparency International (TI) found that more than half of those surveyed had first-hand experience of paying a bribe or peddling influence to get a job done in a public office in the previous year. A follow-up study in 2008 found this rate to be 40 percent. In 1996, red tape, bureaucracy, and the Licence Raj were suggested as a cause for institutionalised corruption and inefficiency. 21st century reports suggest the causes of corruption include excessive regulations and approval requirements, mandated spending programs, monopoly of certain goods and service providers by government-controlled institutions, bureaucracy with discretionary powers, and lack of transparent laws and processes.

Computerisation of services, various central and state vigilance commissions, and the 2005 Right to Information Act – which requires government officials to furnish information requested by citizens or face punitive action – have considerably reduced corruption and opened avenues to redress grievances.

=== Overcriminalisation ===
The use of criminal punishment in India has expanded indiscriminatory into civil, social, economic, and regulatory affairs becoming a tool for day-to-day governance. Scholars have noted crude estimations of offences ranging from 12,000 to 150,000. A 2025 report by Vidhi Centre for Legal Policy, a New Delhi-based think tank estimated that federal laws in India contained 7,305 distinct offences across 370 central laws, out of ~890 that were in force then. Specifically related to business laws, a 2022 report by Observer Research Foundation and TeamLease Services noted 26,134 criminal clauses in India's business laws, and asserted that of the total 69,233 compliances in India, 37.8 percent carried imprisonment as a punishment for violation.

=== Literacy rates ===
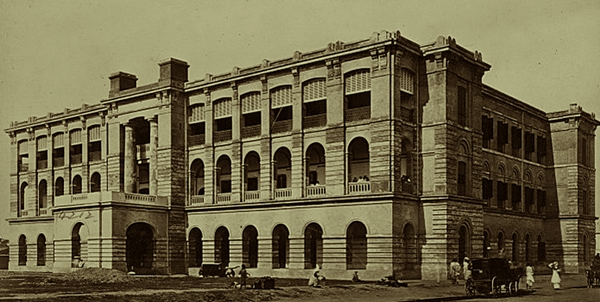
University of Calcutta, established in 1857, was the first multidisciplinary and secular Western-style institution in Asia.

India has made progress in increasing the primary education attendance rate and expanding literacy to approximately three-fourths of the population. India's literacy rate had grown from 52.2% in 1991 to 74.04% in 2011. The right to education at the elementary level has been made one of the fundamental rights under the Eighty-Sixth Amendment of 2002, and legislation has been enacted to further the objective of providing free education to all children. However, the literacy rate of 74% is lower than the worldwide average, and the country suffers from a high drop-out rate. Literacy rates and educational opportunities vary by region, gender, urban and rural areas, and among different social groups.

=== Economic disparities ===
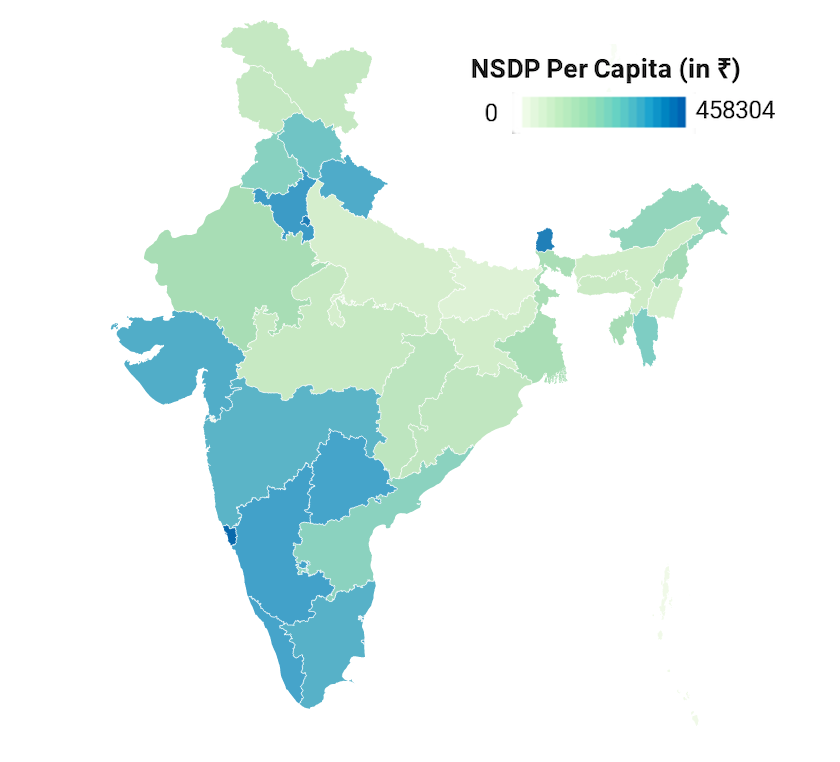
Economic disparities among the states and union territories of India, on GDP per capita, PPP basis, and GDP per capita basis in 2011

A critical problem facing India's economy is the sharp and growing regional variations among India's different states and territories in terms of poverty, availability of infrastructure, and socio-economic development. Six low-income states – Assam, Chhattisgarh, Nagaland, Madhya Pradesh, Odisha, and Uttar Pradesh – are home to more than one-third of India's population. Severe disparities exist among states in terms of income, literacy rates, life expectancy, and living conditions. The four states of Maharashtra, Tamil Nadu, Gujarat and Karnataka alone are projected to account for almost 50% of India's GDP by 2030; the five South Indian states are projected to contribute 35% of India's GDP by 2030 despite currently having 20% of India's population.

The five-year plans, especially in the pre-liberalisation era, attempted to reduce regional disparities by encouraging industrial development in the interior regions and distributing industries across states. The results have been discouraging as these measures increased inefficiency and hampered effective industrial growth. The more advanced states have been better placed to benefit from liberalisation, with well-developed infrastructure and an educated and skilled workforce, which attract the manufacturing and service sectors. Governments of less-advanced states have tried to reduce disparities by offering tax holidays and cheap land and focused on sectors like tourism, which can develop faster than other sectors. India's income Gini coefficient is 33.9, according to the United Nations Development Programme (UNDP), indicating overall income distribution to be more uniform than East Asia, Latin America, and Africa. According to a 2021 report by the Pew Research Center, India has roughly 1.2 billion lower-income individuals, 66 million middle-income individuals, 16 million upper-middle-income individuals, and 2 million in the high-income group. As per The Economist, 78 million of India's population are considered middle class as of 2017, if defined using the cutoff of those making more than $10 per day, a standard used by the India's National Council of Applied Economic Research.

India has achieved significant reductions in both monetary and multidimensional poverty in recent years. According to the World Bank's 2025 Poverty & Equity Brief, India's extreme poverty rate, measured at the international poverty line of $2.15 per day (2017 PPP), declined from 16.2% in 2011–12 to 2.3% in 2022–23, lifting approximately 171 million people out of extreme poverty. In terms of multidimensional poverty, a United Nations Development Programme (UNDP) report found that India was among 25 countries that halved their global Multidimensional Poverty Index (MPI) values within 15 years (2005–06 to 2019–21), with an estimated 415 million people exiting multidimensional poverty during that period.

=== Climate change ===
Several banks including State Bank of India, Axis Bank, ICICI Bank and HDFC Bank have taken the lead in funding green projects even as the Reserve Bank of India comes up with norms for lenders to disclose their actions on climate risk. RBI in an earlier report in 2022, had said that climate change would require "intensive capital mobilisation" for that India needs $17.77 trillion.

== See also ==
- Economic development in India
- Taxation in India
- Natural resources of India
- Rural industry in India
- Economic impact of the COVID-19 pandemic in India
- List of Indian states and union territories by GDP
- List of Indian states and union territories by GDP per capita
- List of the largest trading partners of India
- List of largest companies in India
- List of trade unions in India
