= Business environment in India =

The business environment in India comprises the legal, regulatory, fiscal, and institutional conditions under which firms are established, operated, financed, taxed, and wound up. Both the union government and the states shape it; because states administer much of the law on land, labour, electricity and local licensing, conditions vary considerably from state to state. Assessments distinguish de jure measures, based on statutes and formal regulations, from de facto measures of how rules are implemented on the ground.

From the early 1950s to 1991, private enterprise operated under the "Licence Raj", a system of industrial licensing, reservation, and controls on foreign investment that the 1991 reforms largely dismantled. Since 2014, the central government has made ease of doing business an explicit policy goal. India rose from 142^{nd} to 63^{rd} place in the World Bank's Doing Business report between the 2015 and 2020 editions, before the bank discontinued the report over data irregularities. Its successor, Business Ready (B-READY), is scheduled to cover India for the first time in its 2026 edition.

The government states that over 47,000 compliance requirements have been removed and that states and union territories have implemented over 9,700 reforms under the Business Reform Action Plan. Other analyses, including the government's own Economic Survey 2024–25, continue to identify the volume of regulation, the use of criminal sanctions for routine regulatory lapses, slow contract enforcement, uncertain land titles, high tariffs, and technical barriers to trade as constraints on firm growth. The survey made deregulation its central recommendation, with Chief Economic Advisor V. Anantha Nageswaran urging governments to "get out of the way" of business.

== Measurements and rankings ==
=== Doing Business report ===
From 2003 to 2019, the World Bank published annual Doing Business reports ranking economies on indicators such as starting a business, obtaining permits, paying taxes, and enforcing contracts. India's rank improved from the low 140s in 2014 to 63rd in the 2020 edition, an improvement the Narendra Modi-led government attributed to its reforms. In September 2021, the World Bank discontinued the report after an external investigation found data irregularities in 2018 and 2020 additions, including pressure on staff to alter countries' scores. The Bank has announced its successor, B-READY, which will assess countries on ten topics across the business lifecycle. India was not included in the first two editions; it will be covered in a report expected in late 2026.

=== State rankings ===
Since 2015, the Department for Promotion of Industry and Internal Trade has assessed states and union territories against a Business Reform Action Plan of reform measures, originally in collaboration with the World Bank. The 2024 round assessed 434 reform points and grouped states into "top achievers", "achievers", and "aspirers" and "emerging business ecosystems."

=== Other indicators ===
The World Justice Project's Rule of Law Index ranked India 88th out of 143 countries in 2026. In Transparency International's Corruption Perceptions Index 2025, India ranked 91st out of 182 countries with a score of 39. The Heritage Foundation's Index of Economic Freedom 2026 ranked India 132nd out of 184 countries, in its "mostly unfree" category, citing a burdensome regulatory framework, weak property rights and government integrity, and the large presence of public-sector enterprises.

== Regulatory and compliance burden ==
A recurring theme in analyses of India's business environment is the number of distinct obligations a firm must satisfy across central, state, and municipal laws, and the cost of compliance. A 2022 study, Jailed for Doing Business, by TeamLease Services and the Observer Research Foundation identified 69,233 compliance requirements applying to Indian businesses across over 1536 laws—of which 37.8% carried criminal penalties for violations. The report also noted 3,577 regulatory changes in 2021, averaging ~10 changes per calendar day.

=== Criminalisation of regulatory offences ===
The Jailed for Doing Business report counted 26,134 compliances across 1,536 business laws for which non-compliance could result in criminal prosecution and imprisonment, with labour legislation containing the highest density of such provisions. In a separate report in 2025, the Vidhi Centre for Legal Policy, a New Delhi-based think-tank, noted over 7,300 distinct offences across federal laws in India. Scholars have also noted that criminal law is routinely exercised for civil matters. There has been some effort from the government to reform; it passed a Jan Vishwas Act in 2023 decriminalising dozens of offences, and a more comprehensive one in 2026. Piyush Goyal has stated that the government is working on a third bill to decriminalise minor business-related offences.

== Contract enforcement and judiciary ==
Weak contract enforcement is widely cited as a major cost of doing business in India. According to the National Judicial Data Grid, over 5 crore (50 million) cases are pending before lower courts in India. Researchers have argued that the backlog reflects weak court administration and case management, as well as a shortage of judges.

== Insolvency ==
The Insolvency and Bankruptcy Code, 2016, replaced several overlapping laws with a time-bound, creditor-led process for resolving corporate distress.

== Trade and investment ==
India's net foreign direct investment has declined considerably in recent years; from the peak of $44 billion in 2020-21, it fell to less than $1 billion in 2024-25, and recovered slightly in 2025-26 to $7.6 billion. The gross inflows in 2025-26 were $94.6 billion.

India's most favored nation tariff rate is 17.6%, it has been consistently increasing since 2018; it was 13% in 2014-15 and had increased to 14.3% in 2020-21. In addition, India imposes significantly high technical barriers to trade via Quality Control Orders, and is considered the main user of anti-dumping measures. A 2024 study found that India has filed 17% of total global anti-dumping petitions at the World Trade Organization between 1995 and 2022, filing 1,130 out of 6,582 cases. India has imposed anti-dumping duty on over 300 products.

== Labour ==
India has restrictive labour laws, which have been often blamed for hurting its growth, particularly in the manufacturing sector. ~90% of the Indian labour force is employed in the informal sector. The fragmented architecture of India's central labour laws was considerably simplified in late 2025 when the government subsumed 29 labour laws into four labour codes to maintain uniformity and bring clarity.

== Land ==
The Constitution of India empowers only the states to make laws on land under Schedule VII. As a result, states vary widely in land use, title, floor area ratios, and other land-related matters. Post-independence land reforms in India focused on redistribution: abolition of zamindars, regulating tenancy, and capping holdings (a ceiling on how much land can be owned by one person). Land titles in India remain uncertain, and about two-thirds of civil cases in district courts relate to land and property.

India has presumptive land ownership; the government registers the transfer of title, but does not guarantee ownership, unlike the Torrens title system. The onus is on the occupier to prove the title in case of a dispute. Land records are poorly maintained and often do not represent the on-ground position. Land data is available across different siloed departments and is cumbersome to access.

== Taxation ==
India has simplified its tax laws with the introduction of the Goods and Service Tax in August 2016, which replaced a maze of state-level indirect taxes, duties, surcharges, and cesses into a national-level unified regime. In September 2025, four-tier GST regime was simplified with two main tax slabs of 5% and 18%, along with a 40% rate for luxury and sin goods. Simultaneously, the direct tax law in the country—Income-Tax Act, 1961—was replaced by the Income-Tax Act, 2025, which came into effect from 1 April 2026.

=== Retrospective taxation ===
The Constitution of India allows the government to levy retrospective taxes. In 2012, then Finance Minister Pranab Mukherjee, introduced a controversial amendment to the Income Tax Act, 1961, allowing the government to claim retrospective taxes on past transactions, even when they took place among foreign entities if assets were located in India. The amendment followed a Supreme Court of India ruling that gains from indirect transfers of Indian assets were not taxable in a matter involving Vodafone. The controversial amendment led to tax demands in 17 cases, four of which went to investment-treaty arbitration.

On 25 September 2020, a tribunal at the Permanent Court of Arbitration at The Hague found that India's treatment of Vodafone over a 20,000 crore tax demand breached "fair and equitable treatment." In December 2020, another tribunal of the court ruled the levy on Cairn Energy, among other things, amounted to "direct expropriation," and awarded $1,232.82 million to Cairn, against a demand of $5,584.39 million. In July 2021, a Parish court let Cairn freeze about 20 Indian government properties worth over €20 million ($24 million).

Retrospective tax policies discourage foreign investors. In 2015, former US Assistant Secretary of Commerce Raymond Vickery said the Vodafone case "sent a very negative signal to international markets." Economist Robert Higgs argues that policies that shake investors' confidence that property rights will last hold back long-term private investment. He called this "regime uncertainty".

Following the legal setbacks and international perception, the government withdrew demands on transactions made before 28 May 2012 and offered to refund tax already paid, albeit without interest. It also acknowledged that "retrospective amendments militate against the principle of tax certainty and damage India's reputation."

== Assessment and debate ==
The absence of current international benchmark, pending India's inclusion in B-READY, has left the debate to rest on domestic data and independent studies. Notably, India's reputation as a hard place to do business is accepted despite reforms claimed by the government.

== See also ==
- Economy of India
- Economic liberalisation in India
- Regulatory burden in India
- Indian states ranking by ease of doing business
- Department for Promotion of Industry and Internal Trade
- Labour laws in India
- Viksit Bharat @2047
