= Foreign direct investment in India =

Investment in India's economy

A foreign direct investment (FDI) is an investment in the form of a controlling ownership in a business in one country by an entity based in another country. It differs from a foreign portfolio investment, which remains limited to the secondary markets. Broadly, the term includes "mergers and acquisitions, building new facilities, reinvesting profits earned from overseas operations, and intra-company loans". It is the sum of equity capital, long-term capital, and short-term capital as shown in the balance of payments. It usually involves participation in management, joint ventures, transfer of technology and expertise.

Stock of FDI is the net (i.e., outward FDI minus inward FDI) cumulative foreign investment for any given period. An investment through the purchase of shares in an Indian company is not considered FDI in India if the investor controls less than 10% of shares.

Foreign direct investment in India is a major source of funding for economic development. Foreign companies invest in India across a range of sectors, depending on factors such as relative labour costs, sectoral caps, market size, and regulatory environment. India was mostly a closed economy from the mid-1950s to 1991, when economic liberalisation happened following the 1991 economic crisis. FDI has steadily increased in India.

On 17 April 2020, India changed its foreign direct investment (FDI) policy to protect Indian companies from "opportunistic takeovers/acquisitions of Indian companies due to the current COVID-19 pandemic", according to the Department for Promotion of Industry and Internal Trade. While the new FDI policy does not restrict markets, the policy ensures that all FDI will now be under scrutiny of the Ministry of Commerce and Industry.

== Recent trends ==
While gross FDI inflows into India have generally continued to grow, the net investment has fallen sharply in recent years. Net FDI was reported at $ 27.99 billion in FY 2022-23, falling to $10.13 billion in FY 2023-24 and to $ 0.96 billion in FY 2024-25. Net inflows recovered moderately in FY 2025-26 to $6.95 billion. The government has attributed the fall to rising repatriation and disinvestments by foreign investors, as well as increased outbound investments by Indian companies.

Net FDI in India stood at 0.7% of GDP in 2024, compared with about 4.2% for Vietnam, its lowest level since 2012. A BNP Paribas research note attributed the fall in net FDI to the business environment and structural constraints weighing on the development of foreign companies in India, while also noting other prominent barriers to FDI, including corruption, lack of reforms, and land acquisition.

== Types ==
There are mainly two types of FDI—Horizontal and Vertical. However, two other types of FDI have emerged—Conglomerate and Platform FDI.

1. Horizontal: Under this type of FDI, a business expands its inland operation to another country. The business undertake the same activities but in foreign country.
2. Vertical: In this case, a business expands into another country by moving to a different level of supply chain. Thus business undertakes different activities overseas but these activities are related to main business.
3. Conglomerate: Under this type of FDI, a business undertakes unrelated business activities in a foreign country. this type is uncommon as it involves the difficulty of penetrating a new country and an entirely new market.
4. Platform: Here, a business expands into another country but the output from the business is then exported to a third country.

== Routes ==
There are two routes by which India gets FDI.

1. Automatic route: By this route, investment is allowed without prior approval by the Government or the Reserve Bank of India.
2. Government route: Prior approval by government is needed via this route. The application needs to be made through Foreign Investment Facilitation Portal, which will facilitate single window clearance of FDI application under Approval Route. The application will be forwarded to the respective ministries which will act on the application as per the standard operating procedure. Foreign Investment Promotion Board (FIPB) which was the responsible agency to oversee this route was abolished on 24 May 2017. It held its last meeting on 17 April, which was the 245th meeting of the Board. On 24 May 2017, Foreign Investment Promotion Board was scrapped by the Union Government.Henceforth, the work relating to processing of applications for FDI and approval of the Government thereon under the extant FDI Policy and FEMA, shall now be handled by the concerned Ministries/Departments in consultation with the Department for Promotion of Industry and Internal Trade (DPIIT), Ministry of Commerce, which will also issue the Standard Operating Procedure (SOP) for processing of applications and decision of the Government under the extant FDI policy

== Recipients ==
The World Investment Report 2020 by the UN Conference on Trade and Development (UNCTAD) said that India was the 9th largest recipient of FDI in 2019, with $51 billion of inflow during the year, an increase from $42 billion of FDI received in 2018, when India ranked 12 among the top 20 host economies in the world. In the " Development Asia" region, India was among top 5 host economies for FDI. The report said that global FDI flows are forecast to decrease by up to 40% in 2020, from their 2019 value of US$1.54 trillon. According to Financial Times, in 2015 India overtook China and United States as the top destination for the FDI. In first half of 2015 India attracted investment of $31 billion compared to $28 billion and $27 billion of China and US respectively. Data for 2019–2020 indicates that services sector attracted the highest FDI equity inflow of US$7.85 billion, followed by computer software and hardware at US$7.67 billion, telecommunications sector at US$4.44 billion, and trading at US$4.57 billion.

Top states recipients
States (Note: All values in Billion USD)	Year					
States	Oct–Dec 2019	Jan–Mar 2020	Apr–Jun 2020	Jul–Sep 2020	Oct–Dec 2020	Jan–Mar 2021
Delhi	2.44	1.53	0.95	1.71	1.56	1.25
Gujarat	0.87	1.72	0.40	15.6	5.23	0.65
Karnataka	2.38	1.90	1.35	2.31	2.71	1.30
Maharashtra	3.13	4.13	1.17	2.45	10.02	2.53
Telangana	0.31	0.37	0.55	0.12	0.19	0.30
Tamil Nadu	0.53	0.48	0.44	0.49	0.74	0.65
West Bengal	0.06	0.13	0.25	—N/a	0.13	—N/a

According to UNCTAD's World Investment Report 2025, India has now moved up a notch in the rankings for FDI inflows and is now ranked at the 15th position in 2024. India's FDI inflows were reported at approximately US$ 28 billion in 2024, broadly flat from the previous year. The country ranked 4th worldwide by the number of announced greenfield investment projects, and 5th by number of international project finance deals, down from 2nd in 2023.

== Government initiatives ==
The Government of India has amended FDI policy to increase FDI inflow. In 2014, the government increased foreign investment upper limit from 26% to 49% in insurance sector. It also launched Make in India initiative in September 2014 under which FDI policy for 25 sectors was liberalised further. As of April 2015, FDI inflow in India increased by 48% since the launch of "Make in India" initiative. In May 2020, government increased FDI in defence manufacturing under the automatic route from 49% to 74%. In April 2020, government amended existing consolidated FDI policy for restricting opportunistic takeovers or acquisition of Indian companies from neighbouring nations. In March 2020, the government permitted Non Resident Indians (NRIs) to acquire up to 100% stake in Air India.

India was ranking 15th in the world in 2013 in term of FDI inflow, it rose up to 9th position in 2014 while in 2015 India became top destination for foreign direct investment. The Department for Promotion of Industry and Internal Trade and Invest India has developed the India Investment Grid (IIG) which provides a pan-India database of projects from Indian promoters for promoting and facilitating foreign investments.

=== Coronavirus pandemic impact ===
On 18 April 2020, the government of India passed an order that would protect Indian companies from FDI during the pandemic. All countries sharing a land border with India would now face scrutiny from the Ministry of Commerce and Industry before any FDIs. These changes were incorporated in the Consolidated FDI policy released on 28 October 2020.

== Sectors ==
During 2014–16, India received most of its FDI from Mauritius, Singapore, Netherlands, Japan and the US On 25 September 2014, Government of India launched Make in India initiative in which policy statement on 25 sectors were released with relaxed norms on each sector. Following are some of major sectors for Foreign Direct Investment.

=== Infrastructure ===
10% of India's GDP is based on construction activity. Indian government has invested $1 trillion on infrastructure from 2012 to 2017. 40% of this $1 trillion had to be funded by private sector. 100% FDI under automatic route is permitted in construction sector for cities and townships.

=== Electronics system design and manufacturing ===
The Electronics system design and manufacturing (ESDM) sector in India is rapidly growing and India is poised to become a global electronics manufacturing hub in the future with targeted exports of US$180 billion within 2025.

=== Information technology ===
FDI in IT sector is one of the biggest in India. Lots of global companies got their R&D offices in India. Bangalore, Pune, Mumbai and Hyderabad are conisderd to be global IT hubs.

=== Automotive ===
FDI in automotive sector was increased by 89% between April 2014 to February 2015. India is 7th largest producer of vehicles in the world with 25.5 million vehicles annually. 100% FDI is permitted in this sector via automatic route. Automobiles shares 7% of the India's GDP.

=== Pharmaceuticals ===
Indian pharmaceutical market is 3rd largest in terms of volume and 13th largest in terms of value. Indian pharma industry is expected to grow at 20% compound annual growth rate from 2015 to 2020. 74% FDI is permitted in this sector.

=== Service ===
FDI in service sector was increased to 46% in 2014–15. It is US$1.88 billion in 2017. Service sector includes banking, insurance, outsourcing, research & development, courier and technology testing. FDI limit in insurance sector was raised from 26% to 49% in 2014. FDI limit in Insurance has been further increased to 74% in 2021.

=== Railways ===
100% FDI is allowed under automatic route in most of areas of railway, other than the operations, like High speed train, railway electrification, passenger terminal, mass rapid transport systems etc. Mumbai-Ahemdabad high speed corridor project is single largest railway project in India, other being port rail network, electrification of Indian railways. Foreign investment more than ₹900 billion (US$9.3 billion) is expected in these projects so far.

=== Chemicals ===
Chemical industry in India earned revenue of $155–160 billion in 2013. 100% FDI is allowed in Chemical sector under automatic route. Except Hydrocynic acid, Phosgene, Isocynates and their derivatives, production of all other chemicals is de-licensed in India. India's share in global specialty chemical industry is expected to rise from 2.8% in 2013 to 6–7% in 2023.

=== Textile ===
Textile is one major contributor to India's export. Nearly 11% of India's total export is textile. This sector has attracted about $1647 million from April 2000 to May 2015. 100% FDI is allowed under automatic route. During year 2013–14, FDI in textile sector was increased by 91%. Indian textile industry is expected reach up to $141 billion till 2021.

=== Airlines ===
Foreigner investment in a scheduled or regional air transport service or domestic scheduled passenger airline is permitted to 100%.

=== Aerospace ===
Indian aerospace manufacturing is also growing rapidly and has attracted huge investments. The industry is projected to reach US$70 billion in 2030.
