= Performance-linked incentives =

Payment linked to an output or performance metric

A performance-linked incentive (PLI) is a form of incentive from one entity to another, such as from the government to industries or from an employer to an employee, which is directly related to the performance or output of the recipient and which may be specified in a government scheme or a contract. PLI may either be open-ended which does not have a fixed ceiling for the quantum of incentive granted or close-ended which has an upper ceiling as stipulated in the scheme or the contract.

Open-ended incentives are normally applicable to revenue-generating activities (e.g., sales, production, efficiency, competitiveness, etc), while close-ended incentives are associated with quality improvement or support functions (e.g., operations, human resources, administration, etc.)

== Method of calculating PLI ==
Also, in calculating PLI, only the performance and not the potential of the recipient is considered. Potential of the recipient is normally subjective and can be contested. PLI is based on metrics which are absolutely objective and clearly perceived as fair by both the PLI provider and the recipient.

== Government to Industry PLI schemes ==
PLI schemes can be applied in various other scenarios. One common scenario is government's PLI scheme to boost or transform the specific sectors of the industry, trade or commerce. Government's incentives to industry are of diverse types, such as government subsidy, tax incentive, cash payments, waiver of certain types, etc. For example, in 2020-2021 the Government of India (GoI) introduced several targeted PLI schemes, which will run for five years, to boost 13 distinct industry sectors. Under these schemes the industry and companies are given the specific incentives which are linked with their performance on certain parameters. Objective of these schemes entail Make in India, incentivising foreign manufacturers to start production in India and incentivise domestic manufacturers to expand their production and exports. The GoI has introduced Rs 1.97 lakh cr (US$ 28 b) PLI schemes for 13 sectors. For example one of these sectors is the Automotive industry in India, for which GoI introduced 3 schemes, a Rs. 26,000 cr (US$3.61 b) scheme for production of electric vehicles and hydrogen fuel vehicles (PEVHV), the Rs 18,000 crore (US$2.5 b) "Advanced Chemistry Cell" (ACC) scheme for new generation advance storage technologies for the electric vehicles, and Rs 10,000 crore (US$1.4 b) "Faster Adaption of Manufacturing of Electric Vehicles" (FAME) scheme to go green by expediting production of more electronic vehicles and replacement of other types of existing vehicles with the greener vehicles. The PLI scheme to boost automotive sector to encourage the production of electric vehicles and hydrogen fuel vehicles will also generate 750,000 direct jobs in auto sector. These schemes will reduce pollution, climate change, carbon footprint, reduce oil and fuel import bill through domestic alternative substitution, boost job creation and economy. Society of Indian Automobile Manufacturers welcomed this as it will enhance the competitiveness and boost growth.

== Employer to employee PLI schemes ==
=== PLI and Appraisal ===
Appraisals, normally conducted half-yearly or annually, are used to decide on the salary increments and promotions of the employee. These, being permanent increases, take both the performance and potential of the employee into account.

=== PLI's comparison with other benefits ===
==== PLI vs Salary ====
Salary is paid for the efforts that one puts in and PLI is paid for the results. Salary is paid in short, definitive cycles (e.g., weekly, monthly, fortnightly etc.) while PLI is paid in a longer cycle of monthly, quarterly or half-yearly, yearly.

==== PLI vs Bonus ====
Bonus is paid for the performance of the organization while PLI is paid for the individual's performance. Bonus is normally paid yearly or half-yearly. This is normally paid as a percentage of one's salary, or as a fixed amount, of the employee's individual performance.

==== PLI vs Retention Bonus ====
Some organizations give a retention bonus which is payable for the period that an employee stays back in the organization. This is paid for the value added by the employee by virtue of mere presence and not necessary for the efforts or work output. Normally retention bonus is paid yearly or half-yearly which will incentivise the employee to stay back in the organization for the payment

== See also ==
- Executive compensation
- List of single-digit salary earners
- List of largest sports contracts
- List of highest paid baseball players
- Medical specialties, includes salaries respectively
- Salaryman (Japan)
- Peak earning years
