= Startup India =

Government initiative to promote startups in India

Agency overview
- Formed: January 16, 2016; 10 years ago
- Jurisdiction: Government of India
- Headquarters: New Delhi, India
- Minister responsible: Piyush Goyal, Ministry of Commerce and Industry
- Agency executive: Anurag Jain, Secretary, DPIIT
- Parent department: Department for Promotion of Industry and Internal Trade
- Website: www.startupindia.gov.in

Startup India is a Government of India initiative, launched on 16 January 2016. It focuses on innovation, entrepreneurship, and building a reliable startup ecosystem in India. The Department for Promotion of Industry and Internal Trade (DPIIT), under the Ministry of Commerce and Industry, administers the program and manages regulatory frameworks, funding support, and linkages between academia and industry. The program's core instrument is DPIIT recognition as a startup, which confers regulatory and procedural benefits, access to a government-backed pool of capital, and tax-based incentives.

As of 31 March 2026, the program reported close to 2.23 lakh (2,23,000) startups recognised by DPIIT. The government has claimed that recognised startups have created over 23 lakh direct jobs. However, government audits, independent research, and journalistic assessment have found that the scheme's two central financial instruments have reached a much smaller share of startups. The Parliamentary Standing Committee on Commerce noted a considerable shortfall in the Fund of Funds for Startups (FFS) and the Startup India Seed Fund Scheme (SISFS). A 2021 research paper found that the pace and quality of fund allocation, investment, and disbursement under the initiative have been slow and insufficient.

== Criticism and assessment ==
=== Underutilisation and underfunding of funds ===
The initiative established an FFS—a corpus of ₹10,000 crore (equivalent to ₹160 billion or US$1.6 billion in 2026)—to be disbursed by the Small Industries Development Bank of India (SIDBI) and channel capital into startups through alternative investment funds (AIFs). By 2021, startups in India received only one-fifth of the amount from the FFS. The Parliamentary Standing Committee on Commerce noted a shortfall of ₹453.5 crore (equivalent to ₹495 crore or US$51 million in 2026) in budgetary allocation to FFS and SISFS. The Committee also noted 37.82% of the budget being unutilised by January 2023.

An analysis by a New Delhi-based think tank found a considerable lag in capital reaching startups; it noted that by early 2023, about ₹3,931 crore (equivalent to ₹43 billion or US$450 million in 2026) had been disbursed against ₹9,121 crore (equivalent to ₹100 billion or US$1.0 billion in 2026), only about 43% of what SIDBI had committed to alternative investment funds. The analysis also noted a transparency deficit, restrictive norms, fee constraints, geographic concentration, and prolonged holding periods due to exit constraints in secondary markets as other issues for the FFS.

=== Narrow uptake of tax exemption ===
Under the Startup India initiative, the government offered a three-year tax exemption on profits for three consecutive years within a 10-year window; the window was later extended to 2030. The exemption was available under Section 80-IAC of the Income Tax Act, 1961, with approval by an Inter-Ministerial Board. An analysis by the XKDR Forum, a Mumbai-based think tank, from May 2016 to February 2023, the tax exemption was granted only to 1061 startups or about half of the startups that applied for it.

=== Failure to innovate ===
Even after 10 years of the initiative, India has failed to produce transformative technologies that reshape global markets on their own terms. Most Indian unicorns remain unprofitable, and most patents startups filed were rejected in the first round.

== See also ==
- Make in India
- Digital India
- Stand-Up India
- Regulatory burden in India
- Economy of India
