= Atmanirbhar Bharat =

Indian government initiative for economic self-reliance

Atmanirbhar Bharat (Hindi: आत्मनिर्भर भारत, "Self-Reliant India") is a policy framework and slogan associated with the current government of India, led by Prime Minister Narendra Modi, promoting domestic manufacturing, Import substitution industrialization, and support for Indian industry. Modi first used the term "self-reliance" in 2014 in discussions of national security, poverty alleviation, and the Digital India initiative. The phrase gained prominence in May 2020 with the announcement of an economic stimulus package of ₹20 lakh crore (equivalent to ₹26 trillion or US$270 billion in 2026) in response to the COVID-19 pandemic. However, economists have claimed that direct fiscal spending amounted to only about one percent of GDP rather than 10 percent as implied by the headline figure.

Assessments of the initiative note that manufacturing's contribution to India's GDP has continued to decline since its launch. The World Bank puts manufacturing's contribution to Indian GDP at about 13.5% in 2025, slightly higher than its historic low of 13% in 2024—a level last seen in 1967— but lower than 15-16% a decade earlier. The fall occurred despite the government's focus on Atmanirbhar Bharat, Make in India, and Production-Linked Incentive schemes explicitly targeting 25%.

== Origins and ideological context ==
In June 2014, Modi coined this phrase in his first prime-ministerial campaign. In 2022, Union Home Minister Amit Shah said that "Atmanirbhar Bharat" (pronounced [ˈaːt̪mənɪrbʱərət̪])", along with Make in India" and "Vocal for Local", drew on Mahatma Gandhi's Swadeshi movement, describing pre-independence aspirations being revived and adapted.

In March 2021, Finance Minister Nirmala Sitharaman said the Atmanirbhar Bharat campaign is not about bringing back socialism or import substitution; rather, it aims to boost manufacturing. The five pillars of Atmanirbhar Bharat are economy, infrastructure, technology-driven systems, vibrant demography, and demand.

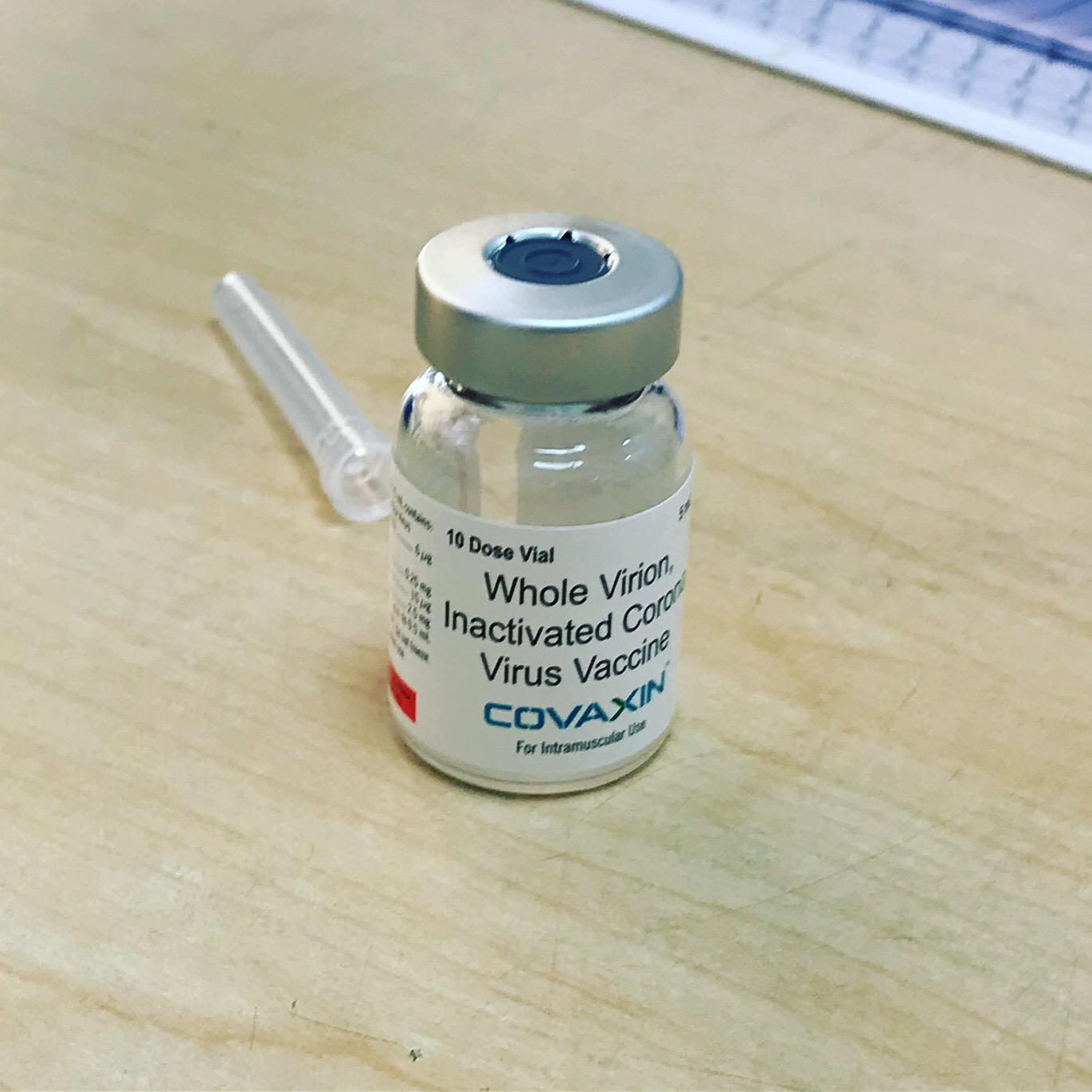
A 5 ml vial of Covaxin has been conveyed as a symbol of Atmanirbhar Bharat.

== 2020 economic stimulus ==
On 12 May 2020, the government announced a series of stimulus measures under the Atmanirbhar Bharat banner, totalling ₹2,097,053 crore (equivalent to ₹27 trillion or US$290 billion in 2026), about 10% of India's GDP. The measures included changes to the legal definition of micro, small, and medium enterprises (MSMEs), increased foreign direct investment limits in defence, and credit and liquidity support for stressed sectors.

Economists who examined the composition of the headline figure found that only a small fraction represented new government spending. An analysis noted that the Reserve Bank of India's own liquidity injection measures amounted to approximately ₹8 lakh crore (equivalent to ₹10 trillion or US$110 billion in 2026), and that direct fiscal spending amounted to only around one percent of GDP instead of 10 percent implied by the headline figure. The remainder consisted of credit guarantees and other contingent liabilities rather than direct expenditure.

External videos
- PM Modi's address to the Nation on COVID-19 (12 May 2020), PMO India (Timestamp 4:39 to 5:14) on YouTube

== Calls to boycott Chinese goods ==
Alongside the coronavirus pandemic, Atmanirbhar Bharat Abhiyan could be seen in the context of India-China relations and India's economic dependence on China in some sectors. There were calls to boycott Chinese products and promote domestic firms following the Galwan Valley skirmish on 15 June 2020, which resulted in several deaths. The Swadeshi Jagaran Manch, an affiliate of the Rashtriya Swayamsevak Sangh, said that if the government is serious about making India self-reliant, it should not award contracts to Chinese companies in infrastructure projects such as the Delhi–Meerut Regional Rapid Transit System. A Chinese company was awarded a contract for 5.6 km (3.5 miles) of the project.

== Implementation ==
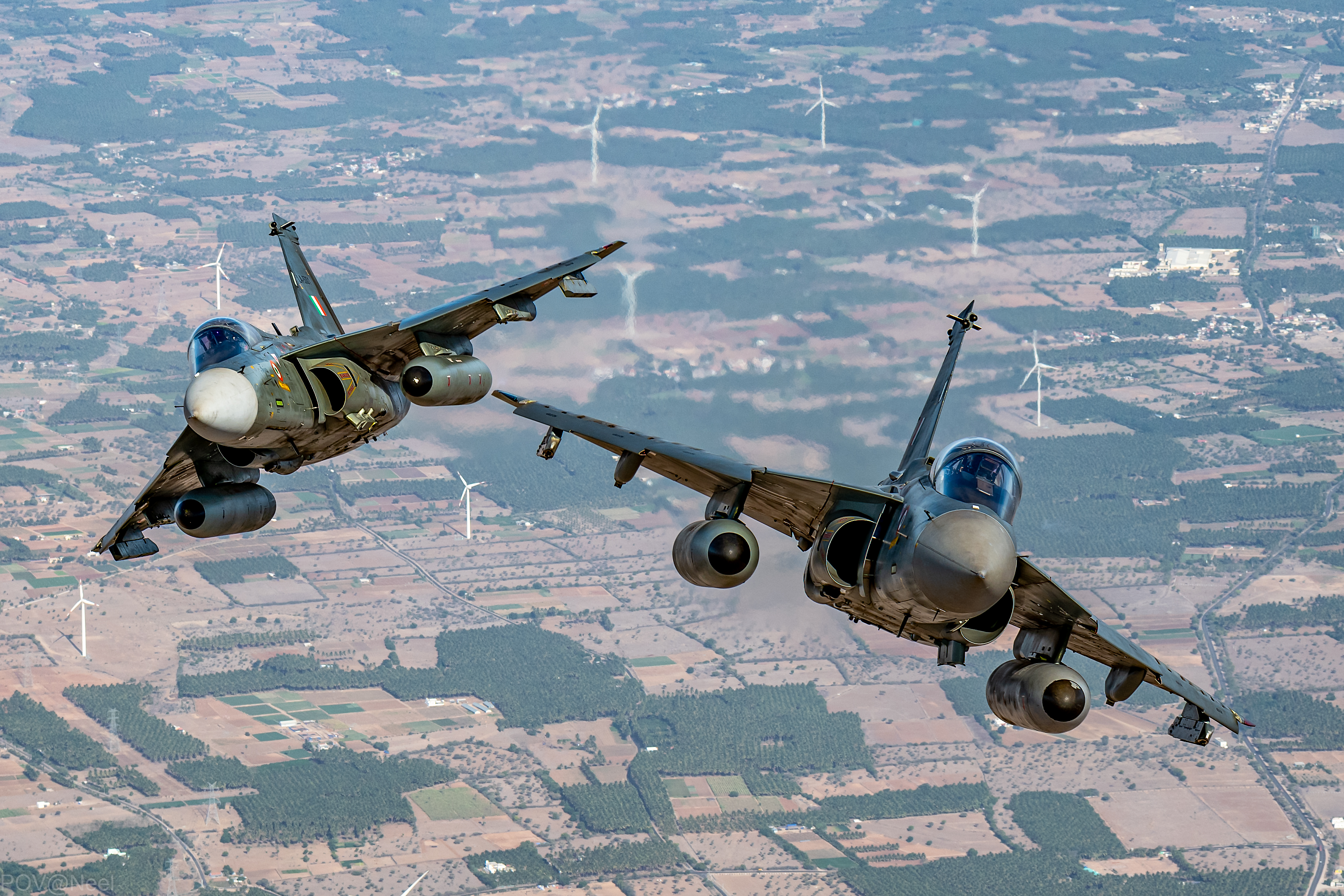
Initial operating capability variants of No. 45 Squadron doing air manoeuvers.

Indigenous HAL Tejas is a multirole light fighter, with indigenous content being 59.7% by value and 75.5% by number (2016). Indigenisation of a number of parts is underway.

=== Defence sector ===
Defence manufacturing has been a significant focus of the initiative. The Ministry of Defence introduced the Defence Production and Export Promotion Policy and the Defence Acquisition Procedure in 2020, allowing private firms to hold majority stakes in joint ventures with public-sector organizations and to export up to 25 percent of output.

In August 2020, Defence Minister Rajnath Singh announced the Defence Ministry was "now ready for a big push to the Atmanirbhar Bharat initiative" by imposing import prohibitions on 101 military items in a staged manner over five years. In the following months, more positive indigenisation lists and negative import lists were released. The new legislation was portrayed as an initiative towards increasing India's self-reliance. A new category of procurement, Indian Indigenously Designed, Developed, and Manufactured (Indian-IDDM), was created. Reform of the Ordnance Factory Board and giving the new defence public sector undertaking units large-scale orders was a move towards military self-reliance. Equipment manufactured under Indian-IDDM has been handed over to the military. In the fiscal year 2022, the Ministry of Defence decided to spend 65% of its capital budget on domestic procurement. Increased self-reliance is also being seen in the construction of its warships and submarines.

== Reception ==
The initiative received mixed responses, with supporters pointing to rapid domestic scaling in critical sectors such as personal protective equipment, pharmaceuticals, vaccines, and personal hygiene products needed to address the pandemic effectively. Swaminathan Aiyar, writing for The Economic Times, said in the 1960s and 1970s, India's drive for self-sufficiency was unsuccessful, and doing the same thing again was not advisable. Arvind Panagariya has criticised self-sufficiency and protectionist policies in favour of free trade in the context of India's past. Sadanand Dhume was sceptical of the terminology and language around the phrase, and whether it was meant to revive pre-liberalization-era policies. "Aatmanirbharta" or "Self-Reliance" was the Oxford Hindi Word of the Year in 2020.

In June 2020, India's Finance Minister Nirmala Sitharaman said "at least don't buy Ganesha idols from China" after commenting on India's over-reliance on 'non-essential' Chinese imports. Atmanirbhar Bharat has been called a re-packaged version or revival of the Make in India movement, using new slogans such as "Vocal for Local". The policy has also been called "economic nationalism". The phrase has been used so extensively that it has become "India's overarching national policy for growth and development". Unfinished reforms in the Atmanirbhar Bharat agenda span governance, urban, and civil service reform. Commenting on the program, the Economist Intelligence Unit stated, "Modi's policies aim to reduce domestic market access to imports, but at the same time open the economy and export to the rest of the world."

Opposition politicians have argued that self reliance is not a new idea, pointing to public-sector companies built in the decades after independence— the Steel Authority of India, the Defence Research and Development Organisation, Hindustan Aeronautics Limited, Central Coalfields, National Thermal Power Corporation, and GAIL India Limited, and academic and research institutions, including the Indian Institutes of Technology, All India Institutes of Medical Sciences, and the Indian Space Research Organisation. Some have also argued that Atmanirbhar Bharat is political messaging with no economic impact.

== See also ==
- Swadeshi movement
- Make in India
- Autarky
- Human capital flight
- Import substitution industrialisation
- Strategic autonomy
- Non-alignment and India
- Economic nationalism

== Bibliography ==
- Nehru, Jawaharlal (1994) [1946 by The Signet Press, Calcutta]. The Discovery of India. New Delhi: Oxford University Press – via Internet Archive.
- Jalan, Bimal (1972). "A Policy Frame for Self-Reliance". Economic and Political Weekly. 7 (15): 757–762. ISSN 0012-9976. JSTOR 4361226.
- Tendulkar, Suresh D. (1974). "Planning for Growth, Redistribution and Self-Reliance in the Fifth Five-Year Plan-I". Economic and Political Weekly. 9 (1/2): 27–40. ISSN 0012-9976. JSTOR 4363346.
- Baru, Sanjaya (1983). "Self-Reliance to Dependence in Indian Economic Development". Social Scientist. 11 (11): 34–46. doi:10.2307/3517074. ISSN 0970-0293. JSTOR 3517074.
- Chakrabarty, Bidyut (1992). "Jawaharlal Nehru and Planning, 1938-41: India at the Crossroads". Modern Asian Studies. 26 (2): 275–287. doi:10.1017/S0026749X00009781. ISSN 0026-749X. JSTOR 312676. S2CID 143462773.
- Biswas, A. K. (1995). "Paradox of Anti-Partition Agitation and Swadeshi Movement in Bengal (1905)". Social Scientist. 23 (4/6): 38–57. doi:10.2307/3520214. ISSN 0970-0293. JSTOR 3520214.
- Behera, Laxman Kumar (July 2013). Indian Defence Industry: Issues of Self-Reliance (PDF). IDSA Monograph Series No. 21. Manohar Parrikar Institute for Defence Studies and Analyses. ISBN 978-93-82169-21-5. Archived from the original (PDF) on 23 March 2021.
- Singh, Bikramdeep (Winter 2013). "Defence Indigenisation: Made in India, by India, for India" (PDF). CLAWS Journal: 248–258.
- Alam, Asraful; Khan, Amir; Ghosal, Nilanjana; Satpati, Lakshminarayan (18 July 2021). "A review of resource management and self-reliance for sustainable development of India under COVID-19 scenario". Journal of Public Affairs. 21 (4) e2725. doi:10.1002/pa.2725. ISSN 1479-1854. PMC 8420201. PMID 34512186.
- Joshi, Shareen; Muchhal, Siddharth; Brennan, Connor; Pradhan, Ria; Yang, Joyce (February 2021), ""Atman Nirbhar Bharat" - Economic Crises and Self-Reliance in the COVID-19 Pandemic" (PDF), International Affairs Forum, Center for International Relations, archived from the original (PDF) on 8 March 2021
- Sarukkai, Sundar (September 2021). "Self-reliant India: self of a nation or a national self?". Journal of Social and Economic Development. 23 (S2): 357–365. doi:10.1007/s40847-020-00115-z. ISSN 0972-5792. PMC 7605322. PMID 34720471.
- Sen, Ronojoy; Murali, Vani Swarupa (October 2021), India's Self-Reliance Initiative: Old Idea or New Direction? (PDF), Singapore: Institute of South Asian Studies
