= Mega Integrated Textile Region and Apparel =

Indian industrial promotion scheme

Mega Integrated Textile Region and Apparel scheme was announced by Government of India in 2021 to promote the industries manufacturing Textiles. The project is aimed for promoting Sustainable Development Goal 9 by United Nations. The scheme aims to integrate the entire process of garment manufacturing, which includes spinning, weaving, dyeing or processing, and printing at one place.

== History ==
Mega Integrated Textile Region and Apparel (MITRA) was announced in 2021 by the Government of India to encourage the textile industry. Shortlisted places in the states can set up Mega Integrated Textile Region and Apparel either at brownfield (which has been built on) sites or at greenfield (not earlier been built on) sites.

== Parks ==
Mega Integrated Textile Region and Apparel is planned to be set up in seven places with a planned expenditure of Rs 4,445 crores.

The following sites were selected for setting up PM MITRA parks.

Sl. no.	Site	Category
1	Virudhnagar, Tamil Nadu	Greenfield
2	Navsari, Gujarat	Greenfield
3	Kalaburagi, Karnataka	Greenfield
4	Dhar, Madhya Pradesh	Greenfield
5	Lucknow, Uttar Pradesh	Greenfield
6	Warangal, Telangana	Brownfield
7	Amravati, Maharashtra	Brownfield

== Benefits ==
Mega Integrated Textile Region and Apparel will have the following facilities:

- Development of large scale and modern industrial infrastructure facilities in an integrated system as a complete value-chain for the textile industry
- Helpful in reducing cost for logistics
- Makes Indian textile competitive
- Increase employment opportunities

== See also ==
- Textile industry in India
- Make in India
- Production Linked Incentive schemes in India
