= Rule of law in India =

The rule of law in India concerns how far public officials exercise power through known, general and fairly applied rules, and how far citizens, firms and officials are bound by and protected by them in practice. The Constitution of India commits the state to equality before the law (Article 14), protection of life and personal liberties (Articles 19 and 21), and judicial review (Article 32 and 226). The Supreme Court treats the rule of law as part of the Constitution's basic structure. Historians trace Indian thinking about the idea from debates in ancient texts to the colonial rule, under which law both restrained and entrenched state authority.

Scholars across disciplines have noted a gap between the constitutional commitment and practice. Economists have linked slow courts to weak contract enforcement and political scientists have studied criminalisation of politics and growing executive powers of the government; and sociological and anthropological studies have documented the coexistence of formal law with community justice and discretionary policing. Government of India has done several procedural and digital reforms; supporters and critics continue to debate whether the rule of law in India is strengthening or weakening.

== Concept ==
British jurist A. V. Dicey, in his Introduction to the Study of the Law of the Constitution (1885), identified three elements of the rule of law: the supremacy of law over arbitrary power, the equality of all persons before ordinary courts, and protection of rights through judicial decisions. Economist and philosopher Friedrich Hayek defined it as the principle that government in all its actions is bound by the rules fixed and published beforehand, so that individuals could foresee how coercive powers would be used and plan their actions accordingly. Later theorists have distinguished this "thin" conception from a "thicker", more substantive definition of the rule of law, which includes fundamental rights, democracy, and other parameters such as public rules, generality, impartiality, and prospective and uniform application. Economist and philosopher Amartya Sen, drawing on early Indian jurisprudence, contrasts niti and nyaya, two Sanskrit words for justice. Niti refers to procedural, formal rules or institutions, while nyaya refers to a broader concept of justice.

== History ==
=== Ancient and medieval traditions ===
Ancient Indian texts discuss the sources of law and rulers' duties. The Arthashastra names four bases of legal decision—dharma (law), vyavahara (transaction), charitra (custom), and rajashasana (royal edict)—and states that each later one prevails over the earlier. Chanakya describes law as resting on truth, convention on witnesses, custom on the people's consensus, and royal edict on the king's command. Legal historian Donald R. Davis has argued that much of classical Hindu law was made and enforced within households, castes, guilds, and other groups rather than by the state.

=== Colonial rule ===
The East India Company and later the British Raj presented codified law and courts as a source of legitimacy, and enacted codes such as the Indian Penal Code of 1860, which remained in force until the Bharatiya Nyaya Sanhita replaced it in July 2024. Historian Radhika Singha describes early colonial criminal justice as a "despotism of law", in which formal legal procedures coexisted with significant executive powers. Historian Elizabeth Kolsky shows that colonial courts regularly treated Europeans accused of violence against Indians leniently, and legal scholar Nasser Hussain argues that the colonial state relied on emergency powers and preventive detention alongside ordinary law. The colonial sedition law, Section 124A of the Indian Penal Code, was used against nationalist leaders including Bal Gangadhar Tilak and Mahatma Gandhi. Gandhi's Hind Swaraj (1909), argued that lawyers and courts strengthened British rule and encouraged quarrels, and that disputes were better settled within communities.

=== Constitution-making ===
The Constituent Assembly adopted a written constitution with enforceable fundamental rights and judicial review, but also retained the colonial machinery for law enforcement by adopting many parts of the Government of India Act, 1935. The framers also retained preventive detention under Article 22.

== Constitutional and judicial framework ==
In Kesavananda Bharati v. State of Kerala (1973), the Supreme Court of India held that the Parliament cannot amend the Constitution to destroy its basic structure. Later judgments have considered the rule of law and judicial review as part of the basic structure.

=== Judicial pendency ===
Judicial delay is a long-standing concern. According to the National Judicial Data Grid over 5 crore (50 million) cases are pending in Indian courts. Researchers at Carnegie India attribute the backlog of cases to weak court administration and case management, along with a shortage of judges. A survey by DAKSH, a legal think tank, found that about two-thirds of pending civil cases are related to immovable property. Delay in courts is often cited as a cause of weak contract enforcement and a cost of doing business in India.

== Politics and governance ==
=== Criminalisation of politics ===
An analysis of candidates' sworn declarations by the Association for Democratic Reforms found that 251 of the 543 members elected to the Lok Sabha in 2024, or 46%, had declared pending criminal cases against themselves. Political analyst Milan Vaishnav argues that voters in areas where the state is weak may support candidates with criminal records because they are seen as able to get things done, and that parties field them because they can finance their own campaigns.

== Measurement ==
In the World Justice Project's Rule of Law Index 2026, India ranks 88th of 143 countries with an overall score of 0.48 on a scale of 0 to 1 (one being the strongest adherence to the rule of law). The index combines eight factors, including constraints on governmental powers, absence of corruption, fundamental rights, and civil and criminal justice.

== See also ==
- Judiciary of India
- Rule of law
- Basic structure doctrine
- Law enforcement in India
- Business environment in India
- Corruption in India
- Legal pluralism
- Issues in the judiciary of India
