= Overcriminalisation in India =

Overcriminalisation in India refers to the excessive use of criminal sanctions, including imprisonment, as the default penalty for relatively minor offences. The country's penal system relies heavily on incarceration. The instinct to use imprisonment as a regulatory tool remains deeply embedded in India's legislative culture. In January 2025, The Economist claimed that governments in India make it impossible not to be a rule-breaker. The use of criminal punishments in India has expanded indiscriminately into civil, social, economic, and regulatory matters - becoming a tool for day-to-day governance. Scholars have noted approximate estimations of offences ranging from 12,000 to 150,000.

A 2025 report by Vidhi Centre for Legal Policy, a New Delhi based think tank estimated that federal laws in India contained 7,305 distinct offences across 370 central laws, out of ~890 that were in force then. A 2022 report by Observer Research Foundation and TeamLease Services noted 26,134 criminal clauses in India's business laws, and asserted that of the total 69,233 compliances in India, 37.8 percent carried criminal punishment for violation.

The Government of India has taken several initiatives to decriminalise laws in India with Jan Vishwas acts and other amendments. However, the efforts have been heavily criticised for trading justice for revenue, replacing accountability with administrative convenience, being hijacked by powerful lobbies, reducing the deterrent effect of laws, giving unfettered powers to administrative officers, and also for not doing meaningful reforms by including laws which wouldn't have practical implications.

== Background ==
"Overcriminalisation" is used to describe the expansion of criminal law beyond its traditional domain of punishing wrongful conduct. In India, laws overwhelmingly use criminal punishment instead of a civil penalty, licence suspension, or administrative sanctions for relatively minor offences, such as regulatory lapse, late filing, incomplete disclosure in administrative forms, or technical breach of licensing conditions, regardless of the seriousness of the conduct.

The roots of criminal regulation of conduct in India lie in colonial-era legislation, much of which combined licensing and revenue functions with punitive sanctions modeled on English law from the 19th century. Several hundred of pre-colonial legislation remain in force in India.

== Scale and scope ==
While there has been significant scholarly inquiry into overcriminalisation in India, two research reports have been particularly influential and are widely cited. They are;

=== Jailed for doing business ===
In February 2022, the Observer Research Foundation, a New Delhi based think tank published a report titled "Jailed for Doing Business: The 26,134 Imprisonment Clauses in India's Business Laws," based on regulatory data compiled over 7 years by TeamLease Services. The report noted 1536 laws that regulated businesses in India, comprising 69,233 distinct compliance obligations applicable to running a business in India spread across federal, state, and local jurisdictions. Of these, 26,134 compliances carried imprisonment as one of the punishments for violation, with some containing prison terms as high as 10 years.

=== State of the system ===
Vidhi Centre for Legal Policy published the State of the System report along with an online database of criminal punishments across federal laws in India. The database noted 7,305 offences across 370 laws in India. Of these, 5,333 offences carried criminal punishment, 433 having life imprisonment and 301 having the death penalty and only 8 having community service as a form of punishment. The report also found that over 75% of all crimes defined under federal laws in India regulated areas beyond the core criminal justice system, such as shipping, taxation, financial institutions, and municipal governance.

== Cases ==
Swedish fashion retailer Hennes and Mauritz (H&M) faced criminal charges in India for violating the Legal Metrology (Packaged Commodities) Rules, 2011. Under the rules, for any length longer than one metre, the label on a packaged commodity should be shown in decimals. H&M was allegedly flouting this rule, which carries a criminal punishment, as it was found to have marked the length of a garment as "122 cm" instead of "1.22 metres". The punishment for the first offence is a fine of Rs. 10,000; and the second violation may lead to one-year imprisonment, a fine, or both under Section 29 of the Legal Metrology Act, 2009. The case was dismissed by the Delhi High Court after five years. In another instance, Cadbury India filed a writ petition in the Bombay High Court following a case booked against the company for using 'angula' in a chocolate advertisement instead of the standard metric units.

In June 2012, excise officials arrested a documentary filmmaker in Worli, Mumbai, as she had 20 bottles of liquor to be added to chocolates in small quantity. Under the Bombay Prohibition Act, 1949, a permit is needed to possess liquor. She was later released on cash bail of Rs. 15,000.

== Reforms ==
The Government of India has repealed over 1500 laws since 2014 based on recommendations of various law commissions and has passed several amendments aiming to decriminalise laws. In 2023 and 2026, Jan Vishwas Acts were enacted to decriminalise offences. The government claimed that the reforms will enhance Ease of doing business and the Ease of Living in India. The Jan Vishwas Act, 2023, decriminalised 183 provisions across 42 laws, and the 2026 Act decriminalised 784 provisions across 79 laws.

== Continuing creation of new offences ==
In July 2026, the Indian Parliament passed a bill to criminalise "insulting" Vande Mataram, the national song. The criminalisation was added by an amendment to already existing criminal offences under the Prevention of Insults to National Honour Act, 1971. An editorial noted it to be; "At best, superfluous and at worst, a blunt instrument in the hands of an overzealous prosecutorial machinery." Insulting the national song carries a prison term, extendable to three years, or fine, or both. The Public Examinations (Prevention of Unfair Means) Act, 2024 was also amended in the monsoon session of the Parliament, which increased the penalty for using unfair means in public examinations to 10 years, increasing it from five earlier.

== See also ==
- Economy of India
- Bharatiya Nyaya Sanhita, 2023
- Regulatory burden in India
