= Indian states ranking by ease of doing business =

Ease of doing business ranking of states and union territories of India is the annual ease of doing business (EDB) index of states and union territories of India based on the completion percentage scores of action items points of annual Business Reforms Action Plan (BRAP) under the Make in India initiative. This ranking of states has been done by World Bank since 2015 and facilitated by the Department for Promotion of Industry and Internal Trade (DPIIT), under the Ministry of Commerce and Industry (India) of Government of India based on the progress of states in completing annual reform action plan covering 8 key areas which has a number of points that vary every year, for example 2017 and 2016 reform plan had 372 and 340 action points respectively. The World Bank ranks individual nations on the ease of doing business index. The ranking of states is not done on same criteria as ranking of nations. Ranking of states does not reflect the level of business-conducive nature of the states, it reflects the willingness of states to reform and attract investments.

India jumped to 100th place out of 190 countries in the World Bank's 2017 ease of doing business index, from 130th in the 2016. In February 2017, the government appointed the United Nations Development Programme (UNDP) and the National Productivity Council "to sensitise actual users and get their feedback on various reform measures". Consequently, now there is competition among the Indian states to improve their current ranking on the ease of doing business index. Centre government as well as various states are executing their respective Business Reforms Action Plan (BRAP) to improve their ranking.

== Methodology ==
In December 2014, Chief Secretaries of states and union territories finalized the basis on which states would be ranked and scored in EDB. 98-points would be evaluated for each state. Accordingly, the first EDB report was constructed with regard to the 98 points and the respective implementation in each state.

The latest rankings released on 5 September 2020 are based on the performance of states on a wide-ranging list of 181 reform points drawn up by the government. This covers 45 business regulatory areas which were used to assess the efficacy and energy of their reforms. These included single window system, inspection enablers, paying taxes, utility permits, and environment, among others. However, the biggest were access to information and transparency enablers, labour regulation-enablers and construction permit enablers. The final ranking is based on two separate scoring systems with the majority of the assessment conducted on the basis of states providing evidence of reforms in policies and procedures undertaken by them.

== 2025 Udyog Samagam ==
During the second Udyog Samagam event in November 2025, the Department for Promotion of Industry and Internal Trade (DPIIT) announced the outcome of the Business Reforms Action Plan (BRAP) 2024 evaluation and recognised states and union territories for their performance in business reforms across 25 reform areas.

According to DPIIT, BRAP 2024 assessed 434 reform points covering central and state-level regulatory reforms. The assessment combined evidence-based verification with stakeholder feedback, assigning 70% weightage to user feedback and 30% to documentary evidence. More than 583,000 businesses were contacted during the nationwide feedback exercise, resulting in over 133,000 interviews conducted through face-to-face, telephone and digital channels.

States and union territories were also recognised for excellence in individual reform areas including business entry, construction permits, labour regulation enablers, land administration, environmental registration, utility permits, services, and sector-specific reforms. Uttarakhand and Punjab were recognised as Top Achievers across five reform areas, while Andhra Pradesh, West Bengal, Jammu and Kashmir, Kerala, Tamil Nadu, Madhya Pradesh, Telangana, Rajasthan, Jharkhand and Chhattisgarh were recognised across four reform areas.

DPIIT also announced the BRAP 2024 state categories, classifying states and union territories into Category X and Category Y based on the assessment framework. Under the methodology, a state or union territory scoring above 90 percent was designated as a "Top Achiever".

== 2024 Business Reform Action Plan (BRAP) ==
The Business Reform Action Plan (BRAP) is an initiative by the Department for Promotion of Industry and Internal Trade (DPIIT), Ministry of Commerce and Industry, Government of India, to assess and improve the business environment across Indian states and union territories. The assessment measures implementation of prescribed reforms related to regulatory processes, business facilitation, transparency and investor services.

The BRAP 2024 assessment included the Reducing Compliance Burden (RCB) initiative. States and union territories were divided into two categories: Category X and Category Y. Category X primarily includes northeastern states (excluding Assam) and several union territories, while Category Y includes states and union territories with more established business facilitation systems.

States and union territories are classified into four groups based on their implementation score:

- Top Achievers – above 95%
- Achievers – 90% to 95%
- Fast Movers – 80% to 90%
- Aspirers – below 80%

=== EoDB categories (BRAP including RCB) ===
Category	States and Union territories
Fast Movers (Category Y)	Odisha, Punjab, Andhra Pradesh, Rajasthan, Madhya Pradesh, Kerala, Assam, Uttarakhand, Jammu and Kashmir, Karnataka
Aspirers (Category Y)	West Bengal, Tamil Nadu, Maharashtra, Gujarat, Uttar Pradesh, Chhattisgarh, Haryana, Telangana, Jharkhand, Himachal Pradesh, Goa, Bihar, Delhi
Aspirers (Category X)	Tripura, Meghalaya, Chandigarh, Dadra and Nagar Haveli and Daman and Diu, Andaman and Nicobar Islands, Puducherry, Nagaland, Arunachal Pradesh, Mizoram, Sikkim, Lakshadweep, Manipur

=== EoDB categories (BRAP excluding RCB) ===
Category	States and Union territories
Achievers (Category Y)	Andhra Pradesh, Punjab
Fast Movers (Category Y)	Rajasthan, Odisha, Madhya Pradesh, Kerala, West Bengal, Maharashtra, Jammu and Kashmir, Assam, Tamil Nadu, Uttarakhand, Gujarat
Aspirers (Category Y)	Karnataka, Uttar Pradesh, Chhattisgarh, Haryana, Jharkhand, Telangana, Himachal Pradesh, Goa, Bihar, Delhi
Aspirers (Category X)	Tripura, Meghalaya, Chandigarh, Dadra and Nagar Haveli and Daman and Diu, Andaman and Nicobar Islands, Puducherry, Arunachal Pradesh, Nagaland, Mizoram, Sikkim, Lakshadweep, Manipur

== 2024 Udyog Samagam ==
In September 2024, during the 'Udyog Samagam' conference, the Union Ministry of Commerce and Industry released the Business Reforms Action Plan (BRAP) rankings, evaluating states and Union Territories (UTs) on the ease of doing business. Here is a table summarizing the Ease of Doing Business (BRAP) Rankings from the Udyog Samagam 2024:

Rank	State/UT	Performance Category
1	Kerala	Top Performer
2	Andhra Pradesh	Top Performer
3	Gujarat	Top Performer
4	Rajasthan	Recognized for Reforms
5	Tripura	Recognized for Reforms
6	Uttar Pradesh	Recognized for Reforms
7	Andaman & Nicobar	Recognized for Reforms
8	Odisha	Recognized for Reforms
9	Assam	Recognized for Reforms
10	Dadra & Nagar Haveli & Daman and Diu	Recognized for Reforms
11	Karnataka	Recognized for Reforms
12	Madhya Pradesh	Recognized for Reforms
13	Maharashtra	Recognized for Reforms
14	Manipur	Recognized for Reforms
15	Punjab	Recognized for Reforms
16	Telangana	Recognized for Reforms
17	Uttarakhand	Recognized for Reforms
18+	Other States & UTs	Need Improvement

== 2015-2019 EDB ranks and scores ==
The following ranks and scores are based on Department of Industrial Policy and Promotion (Department for Promotion of Industry and Internal Trade) figures, Government of India.

State	2015		2017				2019	
State	Rank	Score	Rank	Change	Score	Change	Rank	Change
Gujarat	1	71.14	5	▼ (-4)	97.99	▲26.85	10	▼ (-5)
Andhra Pradesh	2	70.12	1	▲ (1)	98.3	▲28.18	1	Steady
Jharkhand	3	63.09	4	▼ (-1)	98.05	▲34.96	5	▼ (-1)
Chhattisgarh	4	62.45	6	▼ (-2)	97.31	▲34.86	6	Steady
Madhya Pradesh	5	62.00	7	▼ (-2)	97.3	▲35.3	4	▲ (3)
Rajasthan	6	61.04	9	▼ (-3)	95.7	▲34.66	8	▲ (1)
Odisha	7	52.12	14	▼ (-7)	92.08	▲39.96	29	▼ (-15)
Maharashtra	8	49.43	13	▼ (-5)	92.88	▲43.45	13	Steady
Karnataka	9	48.50	8	▲ (1)	96.42	▲47.92	17	▼ (-9)
Uttar Pradesh	10	47.37	12	▼ (-2)	92.89	▲45.52	2	▲ (10)
West Bengal	11	46.90	10	▲ (1)	94.59	▲47.69	9	▲ (1)
Tamil Nadu	12	44.58	15	▼ (-3)	90.68	▲46.1	14	▲ (1)
Telangana	13	42.45	2	▲ (11)	98.28	▲55.83	3	▼ (-1)
Haryana	14	40.66	3	▲ (11)	98.06	▲57.4	16	▼ (-13)
Delhi	15	37.35	23	▼ (-8)	31.69	▼ -5.66	12	▲ (11)
Punjab	16	36.73	20	▼ (-4)	54.36	▲17.63	19	▲ (1)
Himachal Pradesh	17	23.95	16	▲ (1)	87.9	▲63.95	7	▲ (9)
Kerala	18	22.87	21	▼ (-3)	44.82	▲21.95	28	▼ (-7)
Goa	19	21.74	19	Steady	57.34	▲35.6	24	▼ (-5)
Puducherry	20	17.72	27	▼ (-7)	15.65	▼ -2.07	27	Steady
Bihar	21	16.41	18	▲ (3)	81.91	▲65.5	26	▼ (-8)
Assam	22	14.84	17	▲ (5)	84.75	▲69.91	20	▼ (-3)
Uttarakhand	23	13.36	11	▲ (12)	94.24	▲80.88	11	Steady
Chandigarh	24	10.04	29	▼ (-5)	11.54	▲1.5	29	Steady
Andaman and Nicobar Islands	25	9.73	31	▼ (-6)	1.25	▼ -8.48	22	▲ (9)
Tripura	26	9.29	25	▲ (1)	22.45	▲13.16	29	▼ (-4)
Sikkim	27	7.23	33	▼ (-6)	0.14	▼ -7.09	29	▲ (4)
Mizoram	28	6.37	30	▼ (-2)	3.66	▼ -2.71	25	▲ (5)
Jammu & Kashmir	29	5.93	22	▲ (7)	32.76	▲26.83	21	▲ (1)
Meghalaya	30	4.38	34	▼ (-4)	–	–	29	▲ (5)
Nagaland	31	3.41	28	▲ (3)	14.16	10.75	29	▼ (-1)
Arunachal Pradesh	32	1.23	34	▼ (-2)	–	-1.23	29	▲ (5)
Manipur	–	–	32	–	0.27	–	29	▲ (3)
Dadra & Nagar Haveli	–	–	26	–	21.88	–	23	▲ (3)
Daman & Diu	–	–	24	–	28.69	–	18	▲ (6)
Lakshadweep	–	–	34	–	–	–	15	▲ (19)

=== Best states for various areas of assessment 2015 ===
Area of assessment	National average	Best performing State	
Area of assessment	National average	State	Percentage
Setting up a business	31.91%	Punjab	81.48%
Complying with environment procedures	31.61%	Gujarat	100.00%
Complying with Labour Regulations	33.81%	Jharkhand	100.00%
Obtaining infrastructure-related utilities	32.01%	Maharashtra	88.89%
Registering and complying with tax procedures	48.61%	Karnataka	97.73%
Carrying out inspections	19.45%	Jharkhand	72.00%
Enforcing contracts	16.49%	Maharashtra	55.56%

=== Top five states for various areas of assessment 2015 ===
Rank	Setting up a business	Land allotment and obtaining construction permits	Complying with environment procedures	Complying with labour regulations	Obtaining infrastructure- related utilities	Registering and complying with tax procedures	Carrying out inspections	Enforcing contracts
1	Punjab (81.48%)	Madhya Pradesh (72.73%)	Gujarat (100.00%)	Jharkhand (100.00%)	Maharashtra (88.89%)	Karnataka (97.73%)	Jharkhand (72.00%)	Maharashtra (55.56%)
2	Andhra Pradesh (78.57%)	Gujarat (72.41%)	Andhra Pradesh (85.19%)	Gujarat (76.47%)	Gujarat (75.00%)	Andhra Pradesh (90.63%)	Gujarat (71.74%)	Madhya Pradesh (44.44%)
3	Chhattisgarh (77.78%)	Maharashtra (70.27%)	Rajasthan (70.37%)	Chhattisgarh (76.47%)	Madhya Pradesh (75.00%)	Rajasthan (89.47%)	Andhra Pradesh (62.00%)	Gujarat (33.33%)
4	Odisha (71.43%)	Rajasthan (63.64%)	Punjab (70.37%)	Andhra Pradesh (75.00%)	Delhi (68.75%)	Odisha (85.29%)	Chhattisgarh (58.00%)	Chhattisgarh (33.33%)
5	Rajasthan (65.38%)	Andhra Pradesh (62.16%)	Madhya Pradesh (66.67%)	Uttar Pradesh (70.59%)	Andhra Pradesh (60.00%)	Madhya Pradesh (82.50%)	Rajasthan (50.00%)	Tamil Nadu (33.33%)

== See also ==
- Complementary initiatives
  - Act East policy
  - Digital India
  - Make in India
  - My Gov (India)
- Related concepts
  - Brand India
  - India Inc.
  - List of companies of India
