= Salary =

Form of periodic payment from an employer to an employee

A salary is a form of periodic payment from an employer to an employee, which may be specified in an employment contract. It is contrasted with piece wages, where each job, hour or other unit is paid separately, rather than on a periodic basis. Salary can also be considered as the cost of hiring and keeping human resources for corporate operations, and is hence referred to as personnel expense or salary expense. In accounting, salaries are recorded in payroll accounts.

A salary is a fixed amount of money or compensation paid to an employee by an employer in return for work performed. It is typically paid at fixed intervals, such as monthly payments equal to one-twelfth of the annual salary.

Salaries are typically determined by comparing market pay-rates for people performing similar work in similar industries in the same region. Salary is also determined by leveling the pay rates and salary ranges established by an individual employer. Salary is also affected by the number of people available to perform the specific job in the employer's employment locale (supply and demand).

The total remuneration for work includes employee benefits and gross salary. Payroll taxes and income tax reduce the net or disposable income.

== History ==
=== First paid salary ===
The first salaried work would have required a society advanced enough to have a barter system which allowed for periodic exchange of goods or services. Some infer that the first salary would have been paid in a village or city during the Neolithic Revolution, sometime between 10,000 BCE and 6,000 BCE.

A cuneiform inscribed clay tablet dated about 3100 BCE provides a record of the daily beer rations for workers in Mesopotamia. The beer is represented by an upright jar with a pointed base. The symbol for rations is a human head eating from a bowl. Round and semicircular impressions represent the measurements.

By the time of the Hebrew Book of Ezra (550 to 450 BCE), receiving salt from a person was synonymous with drawing sustenance, taking pay, or being in that person's service. At that time, salt production was strictly controlled by the monarchy or ruling elite. Depending on the translation of Ezra 4:14, the servants of King Artaxerxes I of Persia explain their loyalty variously as "because we are salted with the salt of the palace" or "because we have maintenance from the king" or "because we are responsible to the king".

=== Salarium ===
The word "salary" comes from Latin salarium 'pertaining to salt' (sal 'salt'), but the exact connection is not known; a persistent modern claim that the Roman Legions were sometimes paid in salt is baseless. It may have been a salt allowance, but even that is not supported by ancient sources.

=== Roman empire and medieval and pre-industrial Europe ===
Regardless of the exact connection, the salarium paid to Roman soldiers has defined a form of work-for-hire ever since in the Western world, and gave rise to such expressions as "being worth one's salt".

Within the Roman Empire or (later) medieval and pre-industrial Europe and its mercantile colonies, salaried employment appears to have been relatively rare and mostly limited to servants and higher status roles, especially in government service. Such roles were largely remunerated by the provision of lodging, food, and livery clothes (i.e., "food, clothing, and shelter" in modern idiom). Many courtiers, such as valets de chambre, in late medieval courts were paid annual amounts, sometimes supplemented by large if unpredictable extra payments. At the other end of the social scale, those in many forms of employment either received no pay, as with slavery (although many slaves were paid some money at least), serfdom, and indentured servitude, or received only a fraction of what was produced, as with sharecropping. Other common alternative models of work included self- or co-operative employment, as with masters in artisan guilds, who often had salaried assistants, or corporate work and ownership, as with medieval universities and monasteries.

=== Commercial Revolution ===
Even many of the jobs initially created by the Commercial Revolution in the years from 1520 to 1650 and later during Industrialisation in the 18th and 19th centuries would not have been salaried, but, to the extent they were paid as employees, probably paid an hourly or daily wage or paid per unit produced (also called piece work).

=== Share in earnings ===
In corporations of this time, such as the several East India Companies, many managers would have been remunerated as owner-shareholders. Such a remuneration scheme is still common today in accounting, investment, and law firm partnerships where the leading professionals are equity partners, and do not technically receive a salary, but rather make a periodic "draw" against their share of annual earnings.

=== Second Industrial Revolution ===
From 1870 to 1930, the Second Industrial Revolution gave rise to the modern business corporation powered by railroads, electricity and the telegraph and telephone. This era saw the widespread emergence of a class of salaried executives and administrators who served the new, large-scale enterprises being created.

New managerial jobs lent themselves to salaried employment, in part because the effort and output of "office work" were hard to measure hourly or piecewise, and in part because they did not necessarily draw remuneration from share ownership.

As Japan rapidly industrialized in the 20th century, the idea of office work was novel enough that a new Japanese word (salaryman) was coined to describe those who performed it, as well as referencing their remuneration.

=== 20th century ===
In the 20th century, the rise of the service economy made salaried employment even more common in developed countries, where the relative share of industrial production jobs declined, and the share of executive, administrative, computer, marketing, and creative jobs—all of which tended to be salaried—increased.

=== Salary and other forms of payment today ===
Today, the concept of a salary continues to evolve as part of a system of the total compensation that employers offer to employees. Salary (also now known as fixed pay) is coming to be seen as part of a "total rewards" system which includes bonuses, incentive pay, commissions, benefits and perquisites (or perks), and various other tools which help employers link rewards to an employee's measured performance.

Compensation has evolved considerably. Consider the change from the days of and before the industrial evolution, when a job was held for a lifetime, to the fact that, from 1978 to 2008, individuals who aged from 18 to 44, held an average number of 11 jobs. Compensation has evolved gradually moving away from fixed short-term immediate compensation towards fixed + variable outcomes-based compensation. An increase in knowledge-based work has also led to pursuit of partner (as opposed to employee) like engagement.

Salary surveys provide data on salaries for specific jobs throughout the market. Organizations may use salary survey data to develop and update their compensation packages. Individuals may use salary survey data in salary negotiations.

== By country ==
=== Botswana ===
In Botswana, salaries are almost entirely paid on a monthly basis with pay dates falling on different dates of the second half of the month. Pay day usually ranges from the 15th of the month to the last day. The date of disbursement of the salary is usually determined by the company and in some cases in conjunction with the recognized Workers Union.

The Botswana Employment Act Cap 47:01 Chapter VII regulates the aspect of protection of wages in the contracts of employment. The minimum and maximum wage payment period with the exception of casual employees should not be less than one week or more than a month, and where not expressly stipulated a month is the default wage period per section 75 of the Act payable before the third working day after the wage period. The wages are to be paid during working hours at the place of employment, or in any other way, such as through a bank account with the consent of the employee. Salaries should be made in legal tender, however, part payment in kind is not prohibited provided it is appropriate for the personal use and benefit of employee and his family, and the value attributable to such payment in kind is fair and reasonable. The payment in kind should not exceed forty per cent of the total amount paid out to the employee.

The minimum wage is set, adjusted, and may even be abolished by the Minister on the advice of the Minimum Wages Advisory Board for specified trade categories. These categories include building and construction, hotels, catering, wholesale, watchmen, domestic services, and the agricultural sector, among others. The current minimum wages for these sectors are set out in the subsidiary legislation under the Act.

Women on maternity leave are entitled to 25% of their salaries as stipulated by the Employment Act but the majority of the companies pay out at about 50% for the period.

=== Denmark ===
Trilateral negotiations (Danish: "trepartsforhandlinger") between employers', employees' & state organizations determine a collective remuneration agreement for most Danish privately employed blue-collar employees for a period of typically 3 or 4 years. Such an agreement is known as an "overenskomst" or just OK and covers an agreement between a specific employee union ("fagforening"/"fagforbund") and a specific employer organization ("arbejdsgiverforening"/"arbejdsgiverorganisation").

Political agreements made in 1997, known as "Ny Løn" (English: "new remuneration"), instigated a formal remuneration system that almost all employees in the Danish Government are employed under. An individual's remuneration consists of five components:

- grundløn (lit. 'base salary'): base salary derived from education level & seniority
- kvalifikationsløn (lit. 'qualification salary'): additional salary based on qualifications (additional formal or non-formal education, language or social skills etc.)
- funktionstillæg (functional supplement): additional salary paid for responsibilities of the specific role not covered by the above
- resultatillæg (achievement supplement): additional salary paid for specific predetermined achievements, typically used for long-term motivation of leadership
- engangstillæg (one-time supplement): additional salary paid to honor an outstanding effort, typically paid yearly

There is no minimum salary determined by law. A salary is often discussed or given as a gross monthly salary ("månedlig bruttoløn") which is pre-tax but including any pension benefits required by collective agreements ("overenskomst") to be deposited by the employer. This typically amounts to 8-12% of the monthly net salary ("månedlig nettoløn"), of which the employee is also obligated to deposit a part, typically another 4-6%.

=== European Union ===
According to European law, the movement of capital, services and (human) resources is unlimited between member states. Salary determination, such as minimum wage, is still the prerogative of each member state. Other social benefits, associated with salaries are also determined on member-state level.

=== India ===
In India, salaries are generally paid on the last working day of the month (Government, Public sector departments, Multi-national organisations as well as majority of other private sector companies). According to the Payment of Wages Act, if a company has less than 1,000 Employees, salary is paid by the 7th of every month. If a company has more than 1,000 Employees, salary is paid by the 10th of every month.

Minimum wages in India are governed by the Minimum Wages Act, 1948. Employees in India are notified of their salary being increased through a hard copy letter given to them.

=== Italy ===
In Italy, the Constitution guarantees a minimum wage, as stated in Article 36, Paragraph 1

"Workers have the right to a remuneration commensurate to the quantity and quality of their work and in any case such as to ensure them and their families a free and dignified existence."

This constitutional guarantee is implemented not through a specific legislation, but rather through collective bargaining which sets minimum wage standards in a sector by sector basis. Collective bargaining is protected by trade unions, which have constitutional rights such as legal personality. The Constitution also guarantees equal pay for women, as stated in Article 37, Paragraph 1

"Working women are entitled to equal rights and, for comparable jobs, equal pay as men."

A salary is often discussed or given in terms of "Retribuzione Annuale Lorda" (RAL), similar to gross annual salary. Also a severance pay, "Trattamento di Fine Rapporto" (TFR), is required to be deposited by the employer to be paid to the employee on termination.

=== Japan ===
In Japan, owners would notify employees of salary increases through "jirei". The concept still exists and has been replaced with an electronic form, or E-mail in larger companies. The position and world of "salarymen" is open to only one third of Japanese men. From school age these young potentials are groomed and pre-selected to one day join a company as a "salaryman". The selection process is rigorous and thereafter the process initiation speaks of total dedication to the company.

=== Poland ===
Article 65 section 4 of Polish Constitution states that "the minimum amount of salary for work or the method of determining this amount will be specified by separate act". In consequence, Polish Parliament (Sejm) has enacted an Act of 10 October 2002 on the minimum salary for work, which determines the rules and the procedure of establishing minimum salary for each year. The amount of the minimum salary (for employment contracts) and the amount of minimum hourly rate (for service contracts)is announced by the Council of Ministers by September 15 each year in the Official Journal of the Republic of Poland "Monitor Polski". As a result, full-time employees cannot be offered monthly salary lower than the statutory minimum, part-time employees are also covered by the statutory minimum calculated proportionally.

=== South Africa ===
Minimum wages are used widely in developing countries to protect vulnerable workers, reduce wage inequality, and lift the working poor out of poverty. The political popularity of minimum wages stems in part from the fact that the policy offers a means for redistributing income without having to increase government spending or establish formal transfer mechanisms. The challenge to policymakers is to find that wage level that is considered fair given workers' needs and the cost of living, but does not harm employment or a country's global competitiveness.

South African median employee earning is R2800 a month (USD 189.45) and the average earning is around R8500. These figures are found in SA statistics. Indeed, they reflect the huge gap in the South African society with a large proportion of the population under poverty line that does not have the same opportunities for employment.

Median monthly earnings of white (R9500) and Indian/Asian (R6000) population were substantially higher than the median monthly earnings of their coloured (R2652) and black African (R2167) counterparts. Black Africans earned 22,% of what the white population earned; 36,1% of what Indians/Asians earned; and 81,7% of what the coloured population earned. In the bottom 5%, black Africans earned R500 or less per month while the white population earned R2 000 or less, while in the top 5% they earned R12 567 or more compared to the white population who earned R34000 or more per month.

=== Spain ===
In Spain, salaries are generally paid on a monthly basis, with many employees also receiving two additional extra payments in July and December, making fourteen installments per year. The Statutory Minimum Wage (Salario Mínimo Interprofesional, SMI) is revised annually by the government. For 2024, the SMI was set at €1,134 per month across 14 payments, equivalent to €15,876 annually.

Collective bargaining agreements (convenios colectivos) cover a large share of the workforce and strongly influence pay scales by sector and region. According to the Instituto Nacional de Estadística (INE), the average gross annual salary in 2022 was €25,353, with notable regional and sectoral differences.

The distinction between gross pay and net salary (sueldo neto) is significant, as taxes and social security contributions vary by income level and region. Spanish media often highlight this gap, with reports noting that employees frequently rely on a net salary calculator to estimate their actual take-home pay.

=== The Netherlands ===
In the Netherlands the salary which occurs most frequently is referred to as Jan Modaal. The term "modaal" is derived from the statistical term Modus. If the government's macro economic policy negatively affects this "Modaal" income or salary-group often the policy is adjusted in order to protect this group of income earners. The Dutch word "soldij" can be directly linked to the word "soldaat" or soldier, which finds its origin in the word for the gold coin solidus, with which soldiers were paid during the Roman Empire.

The Netherlands is in the top 5 of the highest salary-paying countries in the EU. The focus has been on the salary levels and accompanying bonuses whereas secondary benefits, though present, have been downplayed yet that is changing. The Netherlands claims a 36th position when it comes to secondary benefits when compared to other countries in Europe.

The minimum wage is determined through collective labor negotiations (CAOs). The minimum wage is age dependent; the legal minimum wage for a 16-year-old is lower than, for instance, a 23-year-old (full minimum wage). Adjustments to the minimum wage are made twice a year; on January 1 and on July 1. The minimum wage for a 21-year-old on January 1, 2013, is 1,065.30 Euro netto per month and on July 1, 2013, this minimum wage is 1,071.40 Euro netto per month. For a 23 year old on 1 January 2014 is 1485,60 Euro gross salary / month plus 8% holiday subsidy so 1604,45 Euro gross salary / month

=== United States ===
In the United States, the distinction between periodic salaries (which are normally paid regardless of hours worked) and hourly wages (meeting a minimum wage test and providing for overtime) was first codified by the Fair Labor Standards Act of 1938. At that time, five categories were identified as being "exempt" from minimum wage and overtime protections, and therefore salariable. In 1991, some computer workers were added as a sixth category but effective August 23, 2004 the categories were revised and reduced back down to five (executive, administrative, professional, computer, and outside sales employees).

In June 2015 the Department of Labor proposed raising "the salary threshold from $455 a week (the equivalent of $23,660 a year) to about $970 a week ($50,440 a year) in 2016" On May 18, 2016, the Final rule updating the overtime regulations was announced. Effective December 1, 2016 it says:

The Final Rule sets the standard salary level at the 40th percentile of weekly earnings of full-time salaried workers in the lowest-wage Census Region, currently the South ($913 per week, equivalent to $47,476 per year for a full-year worker).

The Final Rule sets the HCE total annual compensation level equal to the 90th percentile of earnings of full-time salaried workers nationally ($134,004 annually). To be exempt as an HCE, an employee must also receive at least the new standard salary amount of $913 per week on a salary or fee basis and pass a minimal duties test.

Although the FLSA ensures minimum wage and overtime pay protections for most employees covered by the Act, some workers, including bona fide EAP employees, are exempt from those protections. Since 1940, the Department's regulations have generally required each of three tests to be met for the FLSA's EAP exemption to apply:

1. the employee must be paid a predetermined and fixed salary that is not subject to reduction because of variations in the quality or quantity of work performed ("salary basis test");
2. the amount of salary paid must meet a minimum specified amount ("salary level test"); and
3. the employee's job duties must primarily involve executive, administrative, or professional duties as defined by the regulations ("duties test"). "

The Final Rule includes a mechanism to automatically update the standard salary level requirement every three years to ensure that it remains a meaningful test for distinguishing between overtime-protected white collar workers and bona fide EAP workers who may not be entitled to overtime pay and to provide predictability and more graduated salary changes for employers. Specifically, the standard salary level will be updated to maintain a threshold equal to the 40th percentile of weekly earnings of full-time salaried workers in the lowest-wage Census Region.

For the first time, employers will be able to use nondiscretionary bonuses and incentive payments (including commissions) to satisfy up to 10 percent of the standard salary level. Such payments may include, for example, nondiscretionary incentive bonuses tied to productivity and profitability.

A general rule for comparing periodic salaries to hourly wages is based on a standard 40-hour work week with 50 weeks per year (minus two weeks for vacation). (Example: $40,000/year periodic salary divided by 50 weeks equals $800/week. Divide $800/week by 40 standard hours equals $20/hour).

=== Zimbabwe ===
Zimbabwe operates on a two tier system being wages and salaries. Wages are managed by the National Employment Council (NEC). Each sector has its own NEC; i.e. agriculture, communications, mining, catering, educational institutions, etc. On the council are representatives from the unions and the employers. The public sector is under the Public Service Commission and wages and salaries are negotiated there.

Wages are negotiated annually or biennially to determine minimum wages, basic working conditions, and remuneration. If a stalemate occurs, the matter is referred to arbitration by the Ministry of Labour. The ruling then becomes binding on all companies in that industry. Industries often use their associations to negotiate and present their views. For example, the mining industry nominates an employee within the Chamber of Mines to attend meetings and subcommittees, providing a forum for discussions among industry stakeholders.

Salaries are negotiated by the respective employees. However, NEC obviously affects the relativity and almost acts as a barometer for salaried staff. Salaries and wages in Zimbabwe are normally paid monthly. Most companies' pay around the 20th does allow various statutory payments and processing for the month end. Government employees are also staggered to ease the cash flow though teachers are paid around mid-month being 16th. Agricultural workers are normally paid on the very last day of the month as they are contract employees.

Zimbabwe is a highly banked society with most salaries being banked. All government employees are paid through the bank. Since "dollarisation" (movement from the Zimbabwean dollar to USD) Zimbabwe has been moving toward a more informal sector and these are paid in 'brown envelopes'.

PAYE (Pay As You Earn) is a significant contributor to tax being 45%. Given the high unemployment rate the tax is quite heavy. This of course captures those that pay and keep records properly. The average salary is probably $250. This is skewed downwards by the large number of government employees whose average salary is around there. At the top end salaries are quite competitive and this is to be able to attract the right skills though the cost of living is high so it balances this out. A top-earning Zimbabwean spends a lot more money on necessities than say a South African top earner. This is more evident when a comparison with USA or England is done. The need to have a generator, borehole or buy water or take care of the extended family since there is no welfare given the government's financial position.

In the hyperinflation days salaries was the cheapest factor of production given that it was paid so irregularly though it went to twice monthly. As workers could not withdraw their money, remuneration was often in the following forms:

- Fuel coupons were most popular and individuals were paid in liters of fuel
- The product that the company is selling; e.g. pork/meat for the abattoirs
- Foreign currency payment was illegal and one had to seek special dispensation or had to show that their revenue/funding was received in foreign currency like NGOs or exporters
- Shares for the listed companies on the stock market (not in the traditional option scheme but just getting shares)

Prices were price controlled. By remunerating in the product it basically allowed the employees to side sell for real value.

Zimbabwe traditionally had a competitive advantage in its cost of labor. With "dollarisation" and higher cost of living this is slowly being eroded. For example, an average farm employee probably earned the equivalent of $20 but could buy a basket of goods currently worth $500. Now, the average farm worker earns $80 and that basket of goods is, as mentioned, $500, the basket being soap, meal, school fees, protein foods, etc.

=== Pakistan ===
In Pakistan, salaries are generally paid on a monthly basis, with most private and public sector organizations disbursing pay by the end of the month or within the first week of the following month. Minimum wage in Pakistan is governed by the Minimum Wages Ordinance, 1961, though following the 18th Constitutional Amendment, the responsibility for setting and notifying minimum wages was devolved to the provinces. Each province operates its own Minimum Wage Board, comprising representatives of government, employers, and workers, which periodically reviews and notifies wage levels.

As of the 2025–26 fiscal year, the notified minimum monthly wage for unskilled workers was PKR 40,000 in Punjab, Sindh, and Khyber Pakhtunkhwa, and PKR 37,000 in Balochistan and the Islamabad Capital Territory.

Salary structures in Pakistan typically include a basic salary along with allowances such as house rent allowance, medical allowance, and conveyance allowance. Public sector employees are remunerated under a structured pay scale system known as the Basic Pay Scale (BPS), while private sector salaries vary widely by industry, company size, and individual negotiation.

== Negotiation of salary ==
Prior to the acceptance of an employment offer, the prospective employee usually has the opportunity to negotiate the terms of the offer. This primarily focuses on salary, but extends to benefits, work arrangements, and other amenities as well. Negotiating salary can potentially lead the prospective employee to a higher salary. In fact, a 2009 study of employees indicated that those who negotiated salary saw an average increase of $4,913 from their original salary offer. In addition, the employer is able to feel more confident that they have hired an employee with strong interpersonal skills and the ability to deal with conflict. Negotiating salary will thus likely yield an overall positive outcome for both sides of the bargaining table.

Perhaps the most important aspect of salary negotiation is the level of preparation put in by the prospective employee. Background research on comparable salaries will help the prospective employee understand the appropriate range for that position. Assessment of alternative offers that the prospective employee has already received can help in the negotiation process. Research on the actual company itself will help identify where concessions can be made by the company and what may potentially be considered off-limits. These items, and more, can be organized into a negotiations planning document that can be used in the evaluation of the offers received from the employer.

The same 2009 study highlighted the personality differences and negotiation mind-sets that contributed to successful outcomes. Overall, individuals who are risk-averse (e.g., worried about appearing ungrateful for the job offer) tended to avoid salary negotiations or use very weak approaches to the negotiation process. On the contrary, those who were more risk-tolerant engaged in negotiations more frequently and demonstrated superior outcomes. Individuals who approached the negotiation as a distributive problem (i.e. viewing the a higher salary as a win for him/her and a loss to the employer) ended up with an increased salary, but lower rate of satisfaction upon completion. Those who approached the negotiation as an integrative problem (i.e. viewing the negotiation process an opportunity to expand the realm of possibilities and help both parties achieve a “win” outcome) were able to both secure an increased salary and an outcome they were truly satisfied with.

=== Pay gaps ===
Salary disparities between men and women may partially be explained by differences in negotiation tactics used by men and women. Although men and women are equally likely to initiate in a salary negotiation with employers, men will achieve higher outcomes than women by about 2% of starting salary Studies have indicated that men tend to use active negotiation tactics of directly asking for a higher salary, while women tend to use more of an indirect approach by emphasizing self-promotion tactics (e.g. explaining the motivation to be a good employee). Overall level of confidence in a negotiation may also be a determinant of why men tend to achieve higher outcomes in salary negotiations. Beyond differences in negotiation behavior, a majority of the observed gender pay gap is accounted for by average sex differences in vocational interests, occupational choices, and that women bear pregnancy and typically serve as the primary caregiver for young children. These factors reduce continuous full-time labor market experience and hours worked for many women relative to men, and they lead to different distributions across higher and lower paying fields. Studies controlling for occupation, hours, experience, and related variables nearly eliminate the gap. Finally, the awareness of this stereotype alone may directly cause women to achieve lower outcomes as one study indicates. Regardless of the cause, the outcome yields a disparity between men and women that contributes to the overall wage gap observed in many nations.

The Constitution of the Republic of South Africa 239 provides for the right to fair labour practices in terms of article 23. article 9 of the Constitution makes provision for equality in the Bill of Rights, which an employee may raise in the event of an equal pay dispute. In terms of article 9(1) “everyone is equal before the law and has the right to equal protection and benefit of the law'” Furthermore, “the state may not unfairly discriminate directly or indirectly against anyone on one or more grounds, including race, gender, sex, pregnancy, marital status, ethnic or social origin, colour, sexual orientation, age, disability, religion, conscience, belief, culture, language, and birth.” South African employees who were in paid employment had median monthly earnings of R2 800. The median monthly earnings for men (R3 033) were higher than that for women (R2 340) - women in paid employment earned 77,1% of what men did.

The smallest income gap differences occur at thin weights (where men are penalized and women are rewarded) and the opposite happens at heavier weights, where the women are affected more negatively.

== See also ==
- Decoupling of wages from productivity
- Executive compensation
- List of countries by average wage
- List of countries in Europe by average wage
- List of largest sports contracts
- List of salaries of heads of state and government
- List of single-digit salary earners
- Median income
- Paycheck
- Peak earning years
- Performance-related pay
- Salaryman (Japan)
- Stipend
