= Production Linked Incentive schemes in India =

Economic policy of Government ot India

The Government of India's Production Linked Incentives (PLI) schemes are performance-linked incentives that reward companies for incremental sales of products manufactured in domestic units. The incentives aim to encourage domestic manufacturing and to reduce imports. First introduced in April 2020 for mobile phone and electronics manufacturing, the schemes later expanded to 14 sectors. The scheme is administered by the Department for Promotion of Industry and Internal Trade together with concerned line ministries. The combined approved outlay across all sectors is approximately ₹1.97 lakh crore (equivalent to ₹2.5 trillion or US$26 billion in 2026).

The scheme has had mixed outcomes; electronics and mobile phone manufacturing has shown robust performance, increasing India's mobile phone exports from ₹22,870 crore (equivalent to ₹240 billion or US$2.5 billion in 2026) in FY 2021 to ~₹2 lakh crore (equivalent to ₹2.1 trillion or US$21 billion in 2026) in FY 2025. India was a net importer of Key Starting Materials (KSMs) and active pharmaceutical ingredients (APIs) in FY 2022, but became a net exporter in FY 2025. However, against the ambitious outlay, the government disbursed only ₹23,946 crore (equivalent to ₹250 billion or US$2.6 billion in 2026) by September 2025, and the schemes haven't met any of their announced targets. In October 2025, China complained to the WTO against the PLI schemes in several sectors, alleging that they violate WTO Agreements. The approved projects under the scheme span Andhra Pradesh, Haryana, Karnataka, Madhya Pradesh, Maharashtra, Tamil Nadu, Uttar Pradesh, and Rajasthan.

== Objectives ==
The stated aims of the PLI schemes are to attract investment in key sectors and cutting-edge technologies, increase India's manufacturing competitiveness, create employment, increase exports, promote import substitution, strengthen domestic supply chains, higher economic growth, and economic self-reliance.

== Sectors ==
Aligned with Make in India, the schemes cover 14 sectors considered 'key' by the government. These are;

1. Mobile manufacturing and specified electronic components
2. Critical KSMs & APIs
3. Medical device manufacturing
4. Automobiles and auto components
5. Pharmaceutical drugs
6. Specialty steel
7. Telecom and networking equipment
8. Electronic and technology products
9. White goods (air conditioners and LEDs)
10. Food products
11. Textile products (man-made fibre and technical textiles)
12. High efficiency solar PV modules
13. Advanced chemistry cell (ACC) batteries
14. Drones and drone components

== Outlays and disbursement ==
The government of India committed an outlay of ₹1.97 lakh crore (equivalent to ₹2.5 trillion or US$26 billion in 2026). Disbursement under different schemes totalled ₹23,946 crore (equivalent to ₹250 billion or US$2.6 billion in 2026) by September 2025 according to CareEdge Group, a Mumbai-based credit rating agency. The sectorwise outlay and tenure is given below:

#	Sector	Outlay	Tenure
1	Automobiles and auto components	₹57,042 crore (US$5.9 billion)	5 years
2	Mobile manufacturing and specified electronic components	₹40,995 crore (US$4.3 billion)	5 years
3	Advanced chemistry cell batteries	₹18,100 crore (US$1.9 billion)	5 years
4	Pharmaceutical drugs	₹15,000 crore (US$1.6 billion)	5 years
5	Telecom & networking equipment	₹12,195 crore (US$1.3 billion)	5 years
6	Food processing	₹10,900 crore (US$1.1 billion)	6 years
7	Textiles (man-made fibres and technical textiles)	₹10,683 crore (US$1.1 billion)	5 years
8	Critical KSMs/APIs	₹6,950 crore (US$720 million)	10 years
9	Specialty steel	₹6,322 crore (US$660 million)	5 years
10	White goods (ACs & LEDs)	₹6,238 crore (US$650 million)	5 years
11	Ekectronic/Technology products	~₹5,000 crore (US$520 million)	4 years
12	High-efficiency solar PV panels	₹4,500 crore (US$470 million)	5 years
13	Manufacturing of medical devices	₹3,420 crore (US$360 million)	8 years
14	Drones and drone components	₹120 crore (US$12 million)	3 years

== Controversy ==
In October 2025, China initiated a dispute at the World Trade Organization over PLI schemes for advanced chemistry cell batteries, automobile and auto components, and electric vehicles. China has alleged that the PLI schemes violate India's obligations under the Agreement on Subsidies and Countervailing Measures, as the incentives are contingent on using domestic inputs over imports and are therefore discriminatory against foreign inputs. The Indian government plans to defend the schemes vigorously.

== Impact ==
The government has claimed that the schemes across the 14 sectors led to an investment of ₹240,138 crore (US$25 billion) and cumulative exports of ₹15.2 lakh crore (US$160 billion) till March 2026. Cumulative employment through March 2026 has been reported to be 8,49,069 direct jobs and 5.66 lakh indirect jobs.

== Criticism and assessment ==
Actual incentive disbursement has remained at about 12% of the initial announcements through September 2025. Initial expectations from the PLI schemes included an investment of ₹3.48 lakh crore (equivalent to ₹4.5 trillion or US$46 billion in 2026), incremental production or sales of ₹29 lakh crore (equivalent to ₹37 trillion or US$390 billion in 2026), and the creation of 39 lakh jobs. The target has fallen short by 31% in investments, 63.7% in job creation, and 47.5% in cumulative sales by the government's own specified metrics (in nominal terms).

== See also ==
- Make in India
- Import substitution industrialization
- Autarky
- Economic nationalism
- Economy of India
- Regulatory burden in India
