= Viksit Bharat @2047 =

National-level policy framework in India

Viksit Bharat @2047 ("Developed India by 2047") is a Government of India vision and policy framework aiming to make India a developed country with a US$ 29 trillion economy by 2047, the centenary year of Indian independence. Coordinated primarily by NITI Aayog, the initiative includes planning documents, sectoral targets, and outreach campaigns. The initiative has received mixed reactions among scholars, with some calling it a realisable target and others doubting the vision.

== Origin ==
The Indian Prime Minister Narendra Modi first articulated the concept in his address to the nation on 15 August 2022, India's 76th Independence Day.

== Goals and targets ==
The government's stated target, stated in NITI Aayog's working paper "Strategic Imperatives for Viksit Bharat @2047", is to make India a $30 trillion economy by 2047, which translates to about US$ 18,000 per capita. The World Bank classifies a country as high-income if its per capita income is over US$13,395. According to the Bank, India's per capita GDP in current US$ is 2,702.5, compared to US$ 5,066 for Vietnam and US$13,862 for China.

== Focus areas ==
NITI Aayog's strategic paper highlights four broader policy areas for Viksit Bharat @2047; these are:

1. economic competitiveness and growth,
2. national security and stability,
3. global partnerships and strategic influence, and
4. legal and governance reform.

== Reception ==
The 16th Finance Commission Chairman, Arvind Panagariya, has stated that achieving a per capita income of US$ 14,000 is a "realisable ambition" if the country achieves 7.9% annual GDP growth in per capita income in US$ terms. Others have raised doubts, most notably Infosys co-founder N. R. Narayana Murthy, who has criticised governance gaps, using the lack of a viable solution to basic governance issues, such as Delhi's air pollution. A former Secretary to the Government of India noted that "all indications point to the fact that Viksit Bharat 2047" will likely be with scattered development of enclaves rather than growth dividends spreading across all sections."

== Recent developments ==
On 15 August 2026, Modi reaffirmed his government's commitment to Viksit Bharat and announced a "Saptdhara" plan to achieve it while describing it as India's long-term national objective.
