= Magnetic Maharashtra =

Economic summit held in Maharashtra, India

Magnetic Maharashtra Summit
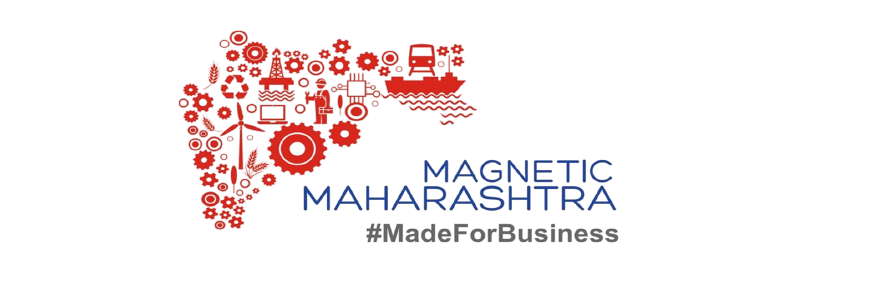

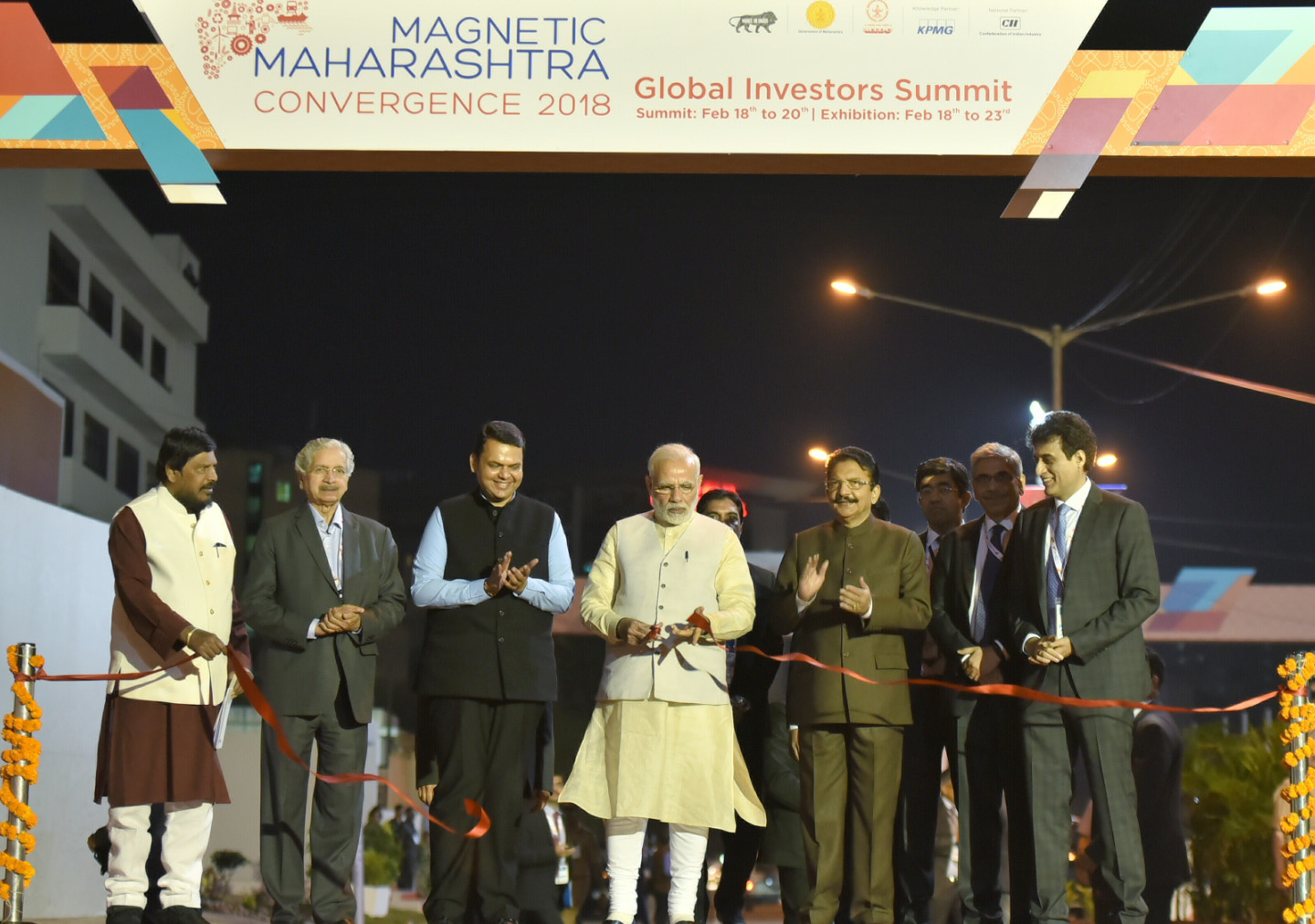
- Inauguration of the 1st Convergence by the hands of Prime Minister Narendra Modi
- Genre: Investment & Business Summit
- Locations: Mumbai, Maharashtra, India
- Inaugurated: 18 February 2018; 8 years ago
- Most recent: 2025
- Patron: Government of Maharashtra
- Organiser: Maharashtra Industrial Development Corporation
- Website: https://www.midcindia.org

Magnetic Maharashtra is a summit held in Maharashtra, India, aimed to attract investment into the economy of Maharashtra.

Under Chief Minister Uddhav Thackeray, "Magnetic Maharashtra 2.0 was launched in 2020.

== 2018 ==
The 2018 edition of the summit, called Magnetic Maharashtra: Convergence 2018, was organised from 18 to 20 February 2018, at MMRDA Ground, Bandra-Kurla Complex, Mumbai, India. The event was inaugurated by the ten Chief Minister of Maharashtra, Devendra Fadnavis and was attended by Prime Minister Narendra Modi and NITI Aayog CEO Amitabh Kant. The summit attracted an investment of ₹12.1 trillion (US$130 billion) with ₹35,000 crore (US$3.6 billion) in the renewable energy sector.

== 2020 ==
The second edition of the summit. called Magnetic Maharashtra 2.0 was launched in June, 2020, amid the COVID-19 pandemic in Maharashtra. The event was inaugurated by Chief Minister of Maharashtra Uddhav Thackeray.
