= Regulatory burden in India =

Compliance and licensing costs in India

Regulatory burden in India refers to the accumulation of a dense, often overlapping body of licensing and permit requirements, procedural approvals, and compliance obligations that govern economic and business activity in the country. India's regulatory structure is considered non-conducive to business as it remains mired in regulatory absence, overreach, or conflicts. The country lacks a consistent and coherent regulatory environment, undermining trust in the regulatory system's integrity. There are significant variations in the structure of governing bodies, tenure of the members, sources of finances, and interface with the government, along with conflicting objectives of optimization and efficiency.

The Economic Survey of India 2024-25 noted that in land, labour, transport, logistics, and the environment, the state regulations were proving to be more of a hindrance than an enabler for businesses. A 2022 report by the Observer Research Foundation and TeamLease Services noted that businesses in India are regulated by 1,536 laws at the federal and state levels, creating a web of 69,233 compliances and over 6,600 annual regulatory filings.

== Definition ==
Overregulation describes a situation in which the aggregate volume, complexity, cost, or discretionary character of regulation exceeds the level justified by market failures or public-interest objectives that the regulations are meant to address. In the Indian context, the debate over overregulation is distinct from, but closely related to, decriminalisation as a broader practice of attaching criminal punishment that is followed by the government.

== Historical background: Licence-Permit-Quota Raj ==
India's regulatory architecture was built principally on the Industries (Development & Regulation) Act of 1951, which mandated industrial licensing for all major sectors of the economy, going as far as needing a licence before establishment, expansion, relocation, and diversification into new products. Following the Fabian Socialism pattern admired by Jawaharlal Nehru, the Industrial Policy Resolution of 1956 further strengthened state control over the economy by reserving 17 strategic sectors exclusively for state ownership and an additional 12 for state-led development. The Resolution set the stage for the Indian economy to adopt Licence Raj over the following decades.

The regulatory reach of the Government of India was further reinforced by the Monopolies and Restrictive Trade Practices Act of 1969, which was based on the recommendations of a government committee led by Subimal Dutt. The law imposed additional restrictions on large firms, ostensibly to prevent the concentration of economic power. Pervasive import and foreign-exchange curbs were separately administered under the Foreign Exchange Regulation Act, 1973. Under this system, derisively termed “Licence Raj” by C. Rajagopalachari, a new industrial unit, required numerous approvals from different agencies of the central and state governments before commencing operations or expanding production.

By the end of 1990, India's foreign exchange reserves had fallen to a level sufficient to finance only a few weeks of imports, and by June 1991 reserves plummeted to less than $1 billion, precipitating a balance-of-payments crisis. The contributing causes included a high fiscal deficit, a widening current-account deficit, and a spike in oil prices following the Gulf War, compounded by the collapse of the Soviet Union, which had been India's largest trading partner. India sought a bailout from the International Monetary Fund, which required deregulation as a condition of assistance.

In response, the government abolished industrial licensing for all but a handful of industries, ended the automatic reservation of investment for the public sector in several industries, and liberalised rules governing foreign direct investment. These reforms are widely credited by economists, including Jagdish Bhagwati and Arvind Panagariya, with unlocking substantially higher rates of economic growth over the following decades.

== Continuing regulatory burden ==
The dismantling of licensing after 1991 did not eliminate regulatory burden in the Indian economy; scholars have argued that the reforms were followed by a steady accumulation of new requirements under labour laws, environmental laws, taxation, corporate laws, land use, and sector-specific licensing. A 2025 report by TeamLease Services found that India's MSMEs face over 1,450 compliances annually and incur costs ranging between ₹13 lakh and ₹17 lakh. In 2022, Observer Research Foundation and TeamLease found 1536 laws governing businesses in India, collectively imposing over 69,000 compliance obligations on businesses.

The Economic Survey of India, an annual publication by the Ministry of Finance in 2024-25, explicitly noted the regulatory burden as an impediment to growth, innovation, productivity, employment, and the formalisation of enterprises, observing that firms in India frequently remain small to avoid the compliance and inspection scrutiny applied to larger businesses.

== International benchmarking ==
In the World Bank's World Governance Indicators, India's Regulatory Quality score was 53.35 out of a maximum of 100 in 2024. The Fraser Institute's annual Economic Freedom Index, India ranked 86th out of 165 in 2025, with the ranking on 'regulation' being 109th.

== Scale and scope of regulatory burden in India ==
Scholars have extensively studied the economic burden of overregulation in India and its impact on the country's growth prospects. Sector-specific studies by TeamLease RegTech have produced granular figures for the compliance burden faced by businesses in India. A single-entity insurance company was found to face 2,236 unique compliances, equivalent to 4,638 filings annually if the frequency of meeting the compliance is considered, in addition to 38 licences, certificates, and permissions under 27 different laws.

According to a report by TeamLease, a standalone solar power plant in Maharashtra with a corporate office in Haryana faces 799 unique regulatory requirements, translating into 2,735 cumulative legal obligations annually. The manufacturing unit alone would require 51 separate approvals, registrations, and permissions. A mid-sized food processing company was found to face 3,200+ obligations annually, equivalent to over 11,500 compliance actions annually.

== Examples ==
Economists have called India's overlapping and dense regulatory landscape “regulatory cholesterol”. While liberalisation happened in 1991, there are still countless rules on the books as relics of India's socialist past. The registration for obtaining the indirect tax registration requires seven documents. Receiving a parcel in India from a foreign country requires two documents, one proving the identity of the recipient and another proving the address.

The Bureau of Indian Standard Act, 2016 has placed quality control orders (QCOs) on over 600 industrial and consumer products in India, including bunk beds and storage cabinets. While the orders are for maintaining quality, they are considered to have a disproportionate burden on micro, small, and medium firms (MSMEs), which do not have the capacity or resources to comply with the complex certification processes. QCOs, as an instrument, have been claimed to be combining “the worst of policy's protectionist, non-transparent, and micromanagement instincts” by scholars.

== Impact ==
India's informal sector remains large and employs ~90% of its workforce, economists have identified the regulatory burden for employers operating informally. A large share of workforce and output remain outside the formal, tax-paying, legally protected registered entities after over three decades of Economic liberalisation in India due to continued density of labour, land, tax, and local compliance requirements which formal businesses face. As per the National Accounts Statistics maintained by the Ministry of Statistics and Programme Implementation, the informal sector contributed to about 45% of India's GDP in Financial Year 2022-23.

Overregulation has impeded employment generation in India, leaving millions of graduates jobless. Economists have advised the country to "develop more coherent policies" to fix the employment crisis. In April 2026, the Organisation for Economic Co-operation and Development noted;

"While digitalisation has advanced, businesses still face complex procedures to register, obtain licences, and meet tax obligations. The tax system’s complexity and unpredictability particularly deter smaller firms and foreign investors. In the services sector, restrictive licensing, professional accreditation hurdles, and foreign equity caps further hinder market entry."

The regulatory regime in the country is also considered one of the primary impediments to manufacturing in India, which contributes less than a fifth to the country's GDP. Businesses have argued that the regulatory regime in India makes the country less competitive, as other countries, particularly in ASEAN, do not face similar regimes. QCOs, in particular, have been known to disrupt supply chains and hurting MSMEs. A World Bank working paper has observed that many QCOs require quality performance that are not linked with safety.

== Reforms ==
=== Business Reform Action Plan ===
In February 2026, the Department for Promotion of Industry and Internal Trade stated that it has launched multiple iterations of the Business Reform Action Plan since 2016, along with other initiatives to enhance Ease of Doing Business. The department claimed that it removed over 42,000 individual compliance across 670 unique laws. However, the impact of these reforms is contested; a prominent commentator on India at an American think tank Center for Strategic and International Studies noting that these reforms “have faltered”.

=== Removal of obsolete laws ===
The Indian government has repealed about 1500 laws since 2014, with multiple repealing acts. However, the impact from it is disputed, as the government itself has claimed that most of these acts had lost relevance, and should be removed from the statute books.

== See also ==
- Licence Raj
- Economy of India
