= Peak earning years =

Peak earning years refers to the time in life when workers earn the most money per year.

== US perspective ==
Given their initial lack of experience, workers' earnings start out low. Earnings peak when workers hit middle age, then begin to fall as retirement approaches. But peak earnings now occur later in life and reach a higher level.

In the 1970s the peak earning years were between 35 and 44 for people with only an elementary school education. However people who graduated from high school and college had a peak income between 45 and 54. In 2009 peak income occurred between the ages of 40–55. Twenty years ago, those in their peak earning years took home about twice as much as workers between the ages of 20 and 24. Now they earn more than three times as much.
