= TeamLease Services =

Human resource company in India

TeamLease Services Limited
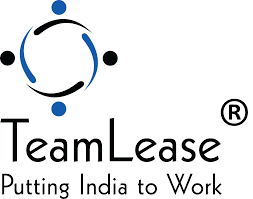
- Type: Public
- Traded as: BSE: 539658; NSE: TEAMLEASE
- ISIN: INE985S01024
- Industry: Recruitment and Human Resources Services
- Founded: 2 February 2000
- Founder: Manish Sabharwal; Ashok Reddy
- Headquarters: Bengaluru, Karnataka, India
- Number of locations: 9
- Number of employees: 3,19,030
- Website: group.teamlease.com

TeamLease Services Limited is an Indian recruitment and human resources services company established in 2000 with its headquarters in Bengaluru, Karnataka. The company operates nine offices across India, with locations in Bangalore, Mumbai, Pune, Delhi, Ahmedabad, Kolkata, Hyderabad, Chennai, and Bhubaneshwar. It is publicly traded on both the National Stock Exchange (NSE) and the Bombay Stock Exchange (BSE).

TeamLease is involved in various sectors, including training, staffing, and other HR services. It also runs a Vocational University and the National Apprenticeship program. It is a Fortune India 500 company.

== History ==
In the year 2000, TeamLease was established under the name India Life Chakravarti Actuarial Services Private Limited by its founders, Manish Sabharwal and Ashok Reddy. The company later changed its name to TeamLease Services Private Limited in 2002.

By 2006, TeamLease had a workforce of over 30,000 associates. In 2009, the company secured funding amounting to $500 million. In 2010, TeamLease made an acquisition, taking over IIJT, an IT company based in Navi Mumbai with a network of 120 centers across India. In 2011, the company received investments worth $250 million and became a founding member of the Indian Staffing Federation, an organization for India's Flexi staffing sector.

TeamLease established a partnership with the Government of Gujarat to set up a private university. This collaboration led to the establishment of TLSU as a university under the Gujarat Private Universities Act in 2013. Classes at the university commenced in 2014. TeamLease also initiated a project involving a partnership between the public and private sectors for apprenticeship (NETAP).

In 2015, the company rebranded itself to TeamLease Services Limited and became a public company. It operates from nine regional offices and employs around 2.82 lakh people. TeamLease holds a 6 percent market share in the domestic flexi-staffing industry. In 2016, TeamLease raised Rs 190 crore by issuing shares to 15 anchor investors, including Goldman Sachs and Merrill Lynch.

== Acquisition ==
In 2016, TeamLease expanded its business into the IT staffing sector by purchasing ASAP Infosystems and Nichepro Technologies for Rs 67 crore and Rs 29.5 crore respectively. These companies were later integrated into TeamLease's Digital division.

In January 2017, TeamLease completed the purchase of Keystone, acquiring 100 percent of its shares for ₹8.2 crores in cash through TeamLease Staffing, a wholly owned subsidiary of TeamLease.

During the same year, TeamLease entered the Telecom staffing domain by acquiring Evolve Technologies and also obtained a 40% stake in Schoolguru.

In November 2021, TeamLease increased its ownership stake in Avantis to 61.5% and rebranded it as TeamLease Regtech. The company also rebranded Schoolguru as TL EdTech, Avantis as TL RegTech, and E-Hire as TL HRTech.

== Subsidiaries ==
- TeamLease Digital
- Keystone Business Solutions
- TeamLease Education Foundation
- TeamLease Skills University
- TeamLease HRTech
- I.M.S.I Staffing
- TeamLease EdTech (formerly known as SchoolGuru Eduserve)
- TeamLease Regtech

== Petition ==
In 2015, TeamLease Services, together with a consortium of 500-plus companies, submitted a petition to the Ministry of Labour and Employment. The petition sought to grant employees the ability to have a say in determining their salary payment methods.

== Awards and achievements ==
- 2009: Awarded the "Samman Patra" by the Ministry of Finance, Government of India
- A case study titled "Concept Arbitrage in India" was published by the London School of Economics with the company
- 2010: The Harvard Business School published a case study titled "TeamLease: Putting India to Work" with the company
- 2023: TeamLease was recognized with a "Certificate of Excellence" by the Employees’ Provident Fund Organization (EPFO), which operates under the Ministry of Labor and Employment
