= Make in India =

Government initiative to encourage manufacturing in India

- Country: India
- Prime Minister(s): Narendra Modi
- Key people: Ministry of Commerce and Industry
- Launched: 25 September 2014; 12 years ago
- Status: Active
- Website: makeinindia.com

Make in India is an initiative by the Government of India to create and encourage companies to develop, manufacture, and assemble products in India and incentivise dedicated investments in manufacturing. The policy approach was to create a conducive environment for investment, develop modern, efficient infrastructure, and open new sectors to foreign capital.

Assessed against its own stated target of increasing the share of manufacturing in GDP to 25% by 2022, then by 2025, and creating 100 million jobs, the program has been unsuccessful. The manufacturing sector's contribution to India's GDP has fallen from 16.7% in FY2013–2014 to 15.9% in FY2023–2024.

== Objectives and achievements ==
Announced in 2014, "Make in India" had three stated objectives:

1. to increase the manufacturing sector's growth rate to 12-14% per annum;
2. to create 100 million additional manufacturing jobs in the economy by 2022;
3. to ensure that the manufacturing sector's contribution to GDP is increased to 25% by 2022 (later revised to 2025).

Assessed against these targets, the program has not been successful. Manufacturing's share of GDP, a flagship metric of the initiative, has actually fallen to 15.9% in FY 2023–24 from 16.7% in FY 2013—14. From 2014 to 2025, India's value-added manufacturing CAGR has been less than 6.9%, turning negative twice—in 2019 due to COVID-19, and in 2022. The estimated indicator for employment in industry (as % of total employment) has risen by less than one percent.

== Investment pledges ==
Following the launch, India received investment commitments worth ₹16.40 lakh crore (US$170 billion) and investment inquiries worth ₹1.5 lakh crore (US$16 billion) between September 2014 and February 2016. Several states also launched their own initiatives, such as "Utkarsh Odisha", "Tamil Nadu Global Investors Meet", "Vibrant Gujarat", "Happening Haryana", and "Magnetic Maharashtra". Japan and India had also announced a US$12 billion 'Japan-India Make-in-India Special Finance Facility" to encourage investment.

However, investment pledges are not a reliable measure of actual investment; a considerable share of these pledges is never realised once actual net investment in India is considered. Indian firms have also not made significant investments in new factories or infrastructure. Foxconn had announced a US$ 5 billion semiconductor and electronics manufacturing facility in Maharashtra in 2015; however, the plan was scrapped later because the company could not find suitable unencumbered land. Similarly, it walked away from a planned US$ 19.5 billion joint venture with Vedanta Limited to set up India's first chipmaking plant, citing delays and disagreements with Vedanta.

== Reform initiatives ==
=== Ease of doing business ===
The World Bank's 2019 ease of doing business index acknowledged India's jump of 23 positions from its rank of 100 in 2017 to be placed at 63rd rank among 190 countries. By the end of 2017, India had risen 42 places on the ease of doing business index, 32 places in the World Economic Forum's Global Competitiveness Index, and 19 notches in the Logistics Performance Index. The growth rate of manufacturing averaged 6.9% per annum between 2014–15 and 2019–20. However, the share of manufacturing in GDP fell from 16.3% in 2014–15 to 14.3% in 2020–21.

In February 2017, the government appointed the United Nations Development Programme (UNDP) and the National Productivity Council "to sensitise actual users and get their feedback on various reform measures." Consequently, a competitive framework among the states was developed to improve their investment climate by establishing an ease-of-doing-business index. The index calculated completion percentage scores for a 98-point Business Reform Action Plan.

=== Global campaign ===
The campaign was designed by Wieden+Kennedy, with the launch of a web portal and the release of brochures on the 25 sectors, after foreign equity caps, norms, and procedures in various sectors were relaxed, including applications for manufacturing licences, with a digital process and a three-year validity. The "Zero Defect Zero Effect" slogan was coined by the Prime Minister of India, Narendra Modi, to guide the Make in India initiative that produces products with no defects and no adverse environmental and ecological effects.

"Make in India Week", a multi-sectoral industrial event at the MMRDA from 13 February 2016, was attended by 2500+ international and 8000+ domestic delegates, foreign governments from 68 countries, and businesses from 72 countries; all Indian states also held expos at the event, which received over ₹15.2 lakh crore (US$160 billion) worth of investment commitments and investment inquiries worth ₹1.5 lakh crore (US$16 billion), with Maharashtra leding with ₹8 lakh crore (US$83 billion) of investments. Previously, between September 2014 and November 2015, the government received ₹1.20 lakh crore (US$12 billion) worth of proposals from companies interested in manufacturing electronics in India.

=== Revision in public procurement practices ===
On June 15, 2017, the Ministry of Commerce and Industry, the nodal ministry for the program, revised the Public Procurement Order and General Financial Rules to incorporate preference for Made In India products. Subsequently, other government agencies published their own orders to extend the scope to their procurement processes.

=== Foreign direct investment ===
As part of the initiative, the government permitted 100% Foreign Direct Investment (FDI) in most sectors in India, with some sectoral caps; for example, the space industry (74%), defence industry (49%), and media (26%), based on relevant government notifications. A few sectors are prohibited for foreign Institutional investors and non-resident Indians, including chit fund business, nidhi companies, agricultural or plantation activities, several types of real estate businesses, tobacco or related businesses, trading in transferable development rights, or strategic sectors (i.e., atomic energy) as per the Reserve Bank of India's Master Direction on Foreign Investment in India.

== Sectors covered ==
Make in India focuses on the following 25 sectors of the economy:

=== Automobiles ===
General Motors announced an investment of US$1 billion to manufacture automobiles in Maharashtra.

In April 2017, Kia announced that the company would invest over $1.1 billion to build a car manufacturing plant in Anantapur, Andhra Pradesh. The facility is the company's first manufacturing plant in India. Kia stated that it would hire 3,000 employees for the plant, and it would produce 300,000 cars annually. Construction of the plant began in mid-2017 and has been completed in March 2019. The plant began production in 2019 with an SUV model specifically designed for the Indian market. Kia president Han-Woo Park announced that the first model produced at the plant would be an SUV(sport utility vehicle) specifically designed for the Indian market. Park also added that Kia would invest over $2 billion and create 10,000 jobs in India by 2021.

=== Automobile components ===
Hitachi announced an auto-component plant in Chennai by 2016 with an increase in their India employees count from 10,000 to 13,000.

=== Aviation ===
Before the Make in India campaign had been put in motion, the first deal to have been done under the broader Atmanirbhar Bharat campaign was the Fairchild-Dornier 228's manufacturing by the Hindustan Aeronautics Limited, by Pushpindar Singh Chopra. French drone manufacturer LH Aviation announced a manufacturing plant in India to produce drones. During Magnetic Maharashtra: Convergence 2018, Thurst Aircraft Pvt Ltd signed a MOU with Govt. of Maharashtra to build an aeroplane manufacturing plant near Palghar district (roughly 140 km north of Mumbai) with an investment of ₹35,000 crore($5.2 billion).

=== Biotechnology ===
On 6 July 2024, Horiba's largest medical equipment and hematology reagent production facility in India was officially opened in Nagpur. The company plans to invest ₹200 crore in phases at the Nagpur plant, which will cater to more than 30,000 hospitals and diagnostic facilities. It will produce medical consumables (reagents), clinical chemistry equipment, and equipment for blood tests. It will act as a hub for exports to nearby nations, with a 50% localization objective initially, and a target of 80–90% localization of products in the future. With aspirations to eventually expand into the Materials & Semiconductor and Energy & Environment sectors, the factory will initially serve the Bio & Healthcare segment.

=== Defence manufacturing ===
As part of Prime Minister Narendra Modi's Narendra Modi Atma Nirbhar Bharat Abhiyan (Self Reliant India Campaign), India's ministry of defence last month reserved 26 items that will only be procured from the local suppliers.

India and Russia have deepened their Make in India defence manufacturing cooperation by signing agreements for the construction of naval frigates, KA-226T twin-engine utility helicopters (joint venture (JV) to make 60 in Russia and 140 in India), Brahmos cruise missile (JV with 50.5% India and 49.5% Russia). A defence deal was signed during Prime Minister Narendra Modi's visit to Russia in December 2015 which will see the Kamov Ka-226 multi-role helicopter being built in India, was widely seen as the first defence deal to be actually signed under the Make in India campaign. In August 2015, Hindustan Aeronautics Limited (HAL) began talks with Russia's Irkut Corp to transfer technology of 332 components of the Sukhoi Su-30MKI fighter aircraft under the Make in India program. These components, also called line replacement units (LRUs) refer to both critical and non-critical components and fall into four major heads such as Radio and Radar; Electrical & Electronics System; Mechanical System and Instrument System.

Lockheed Martin announced in February 2016 its plans to manufacture F-16 in India, although it did not announce any time frame. In February 2017, Lockheed stated that it intended to manufacture the F-16 Block-70 aircraft with a local partner in India, if the Indian Air Force agreed to purchase the aircraft.

Boeing announced setting up a factory to assemble fighter planes, either the Apache or Chinook defence helicopter in India, as well as the manufacture of F/A-18 Super Hornet.

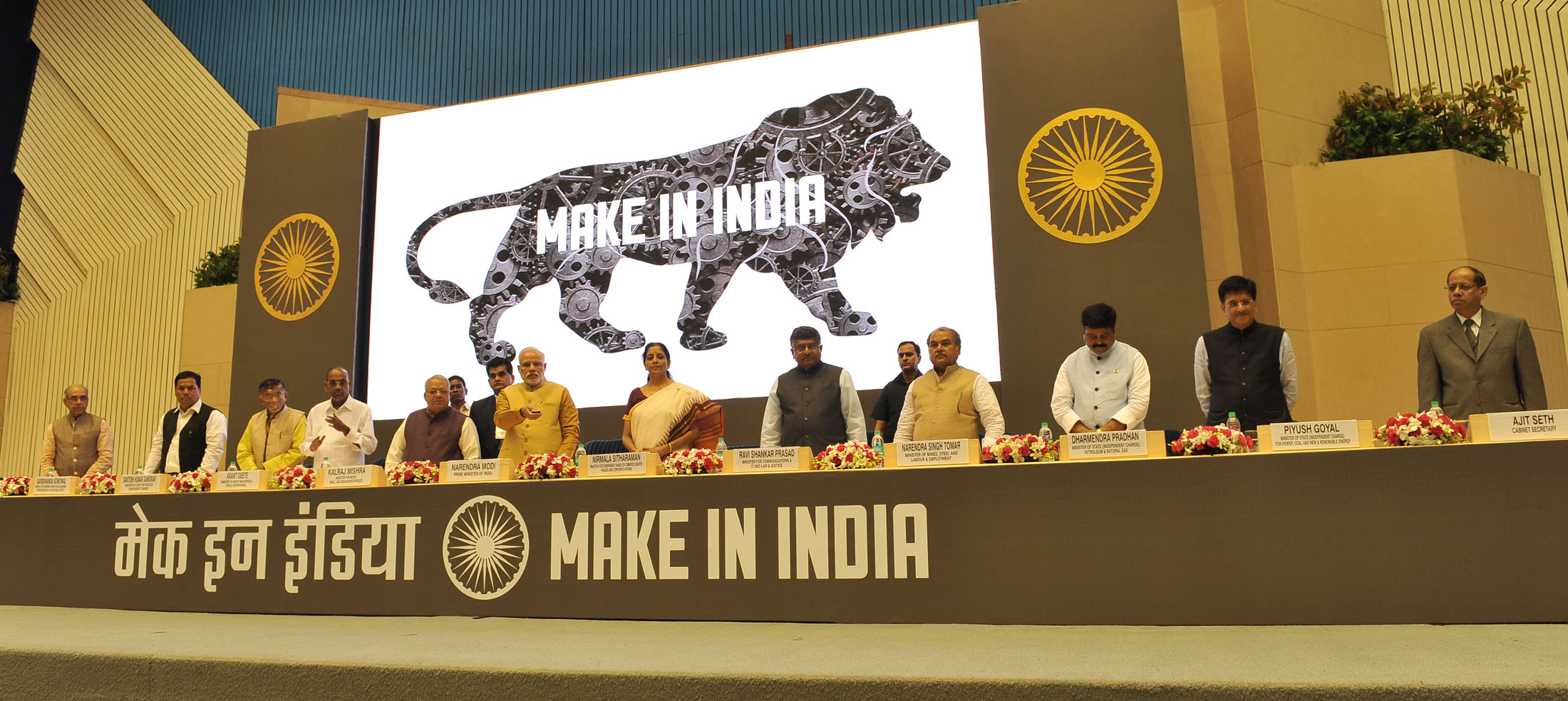
Prime minister Narendra Modi launches Make in India.

In May 2018, the Indian Army announced a ₹50,000 crore (US$5.2 billion) ammunition production project to be implemented in phases over a 10-year period. Under the project, 11 private firms will manufacture and supply ammunition for the Army's tanks, rockets, air defence system, artillery guns, infantry combat vehicles, grenade launchers, and other field weapons. The Army noted that the objectives of the program were to cut dependence on foreign imports and to establish an inventory of ammunition that would be sufficient to fight a 30-day war. The Indian government is also focusing upon indigenous defence communication systems. On 7 October 2025, Defence Research and Development Organisation (DRDO) released ISRA (Indian radio software architecture) to enable interoperability in military communication. A private-academia collaboration between CST Advanced Systems Pvt. Ltd and IIT Jammu developed anti-GPS jamming and identification friend or foe (IFF) devices to address the critical challenges like secure and reliable communication. The devices aim at enhancing the operational efficiency and effectiveness of the armed forces during counter terrorism, raids and other specialized operations.

=== Electronic systems ===
With the demand for electronic hardware expected to rise rapidly to US$400 billion by 2020, India has the potential to become an electronic manufacturing hub and government is targeting to achieve net zero imports of electronics by 2020. After the launch of this project, 24.8% of smartphones sold in India in the April–June quarter of 2015 were made in India, up from 19.9% the previous quarter. By 2019 that number has jumped to 95%.

Various companies pledged investment in India to begin manufacturing

- Foxconn: US$5 billion investment over 5 years in research and development and hi-tech semiconductor manufacturing facility in Maharashtra but it backed out from the MOU as it could not acquire the land parcel at the terms it wanted.
- Pegatron: Apple Inc supplier Pegatron in talks to open second Indian iPhone factory.
- Huawei: new research and development (R&D) campus in Bengaluru with an investment of US$170 million and telecom hardware manufacturing plant in Chennai.
- Motorola Mobility: manufacturing at Sriperumbudur near Chennai run by Flextronics.
- Micromax: 3 new manufacturing units in Rajasthan, Telangana and Andhra Pradesh with ₹3 billion (US$31 million) investment.
- Qualcomm: "Design in India" programme to mentor ten Indian hardware companies with the potential to come up with innovative solutions and help them reach global scale.
- Samsung: 10 "MSME-Samsung Technical Schools" and manufacturing of Samsung Z1 in its plant in Noida.
- Spice Group: ₹5 billion (US$52 million) mobile phone manufacturing unit in Uttar Pradesh.
- Vivo Mobile India began manufacturing smartphones at a plant in Greater Noida with 2,200 employees.
- Wistron: Taiwanese company to start manufacturing of Blackberry, HTC and Motorola devices at a new factory in Noida.
- Xiaomi: smartphones to be manufactured at a Foxconn-run facility in Sri City made operational by producing Xiaomi Redmi 2 Prime.
- VVDN Technologies: ODM based out of India expanded its manufacturing with additional 10-acre Global Innovation Park in India in line with government's Make in India initiative.

=== Food processing ===
Pitha of Odisha, Gushtaba of Kashmir, Chicken Curry of Punjab, Khakhra and Khandvi of Gujarat, Bamboo steam fish, Vada and Medu vada of South India, Khaja and Inarsa of Bihar, Kebab of Uttar Pradesh and Puran poli of Maharashtra have been selected as traditional regional food to be promoted in the ongoing campaign.

Marine Products Export Development Authority announced the deal to supply shrimp eggs to farmer in India for eventual exports of shrimp from India to other countries.

In Odisha Investor Summit, Poseidon Aquatech announced plans to undertake shrimp farming and processing in the state at the cost of ₹100 crore ($14.7 million).

Noodles manufacturer Indo Nissin Foods Ltd also announced that it intended to invest additional ₹50 crore ($7.3 million) to expand the existing facility in Odisha by 2017.

=== Mining ===
During Odisha investor summit, NLC India signed an MOU with government of Odisha to set up a coal mining processing plant at the cost of ₹7,500 crore ($1.1 billion).

=== Railways ===
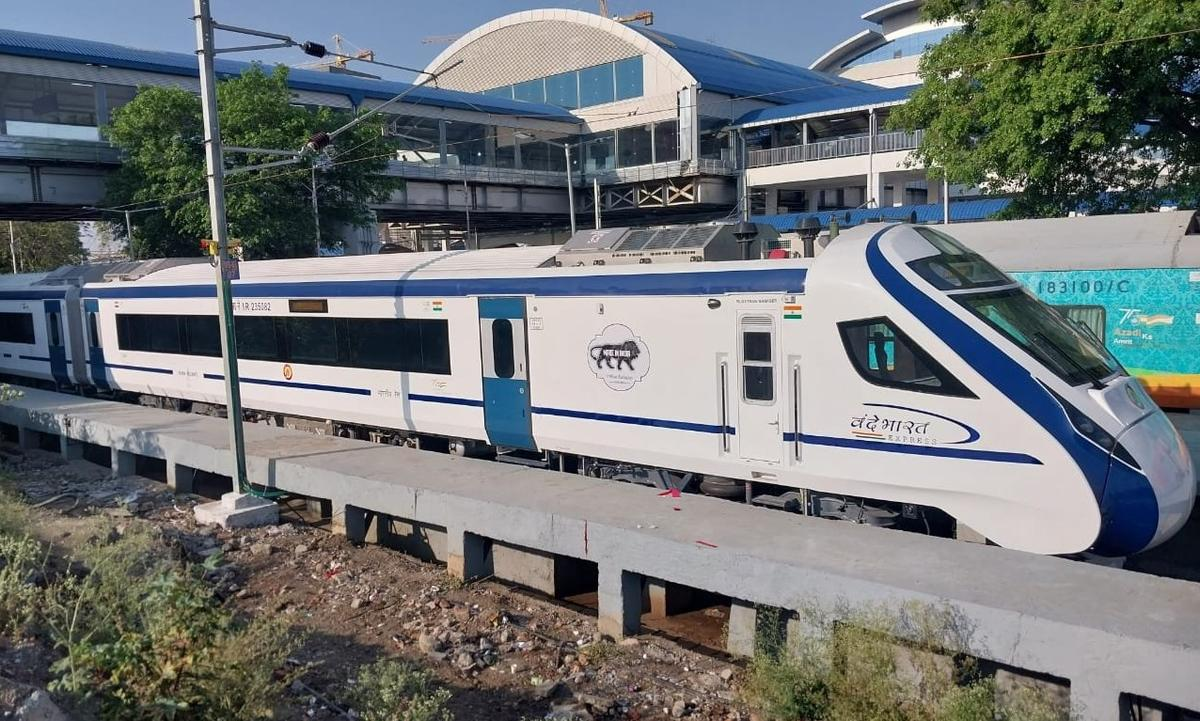
Vande Bharat Express with "Make in India" initiative

- Alstom/GE Transportation: The French and American rolling stock manufacturers announced ₹400 billion (US$4.2 billion) locomotive manufacturing factories in Madhepura and Marhaura in Bihar. Alstom SA intends to start producing huge batteries in 2025 for use in railway traction components. At first, Alstom will import the batteries from France, but later, at its Maneja site in Gujarat, the company will produce indigenous cells.
- Hyperloop One: The American company working to commercialise Hyperloop, signed a Framework Agreement with government of Maharashtra to begin the development of the route from Mumbai to Pune, starting with an operational demonstration track.

=== Renewable energy ===
HPCL Rajasthan Refinery complex in Pachpadra, Barmer. A major 'Make in India' project integrating crude refining and petrochemical manufacturing to boost domestic industrial self-reliance.

In August 2016, NLC India announced that it is going to set up a 500 MW solar power plant in Odisha at the cost of ₹3,000 crore ($441 million)

=== Thermal power ===
In May 2017, the Union Cabinet approved the construction of 10 indigenously built Pressurised Heavy Water Reactors (PHWRs). The contracts for the reactors worth an estimated ₹70,000 crore (US$7.3 billion) will be awarded to Indian companies. The construction 10 reactors with a combined nuclear capacity of 7 GW is also expected to create 33,400 direct and indirect jobs.

During Odisha investor summit, NLC India signed an MOU with government of Odisha to set up a 2,000MW Thermal power plant at the cost of ₹15,000 crore($2.2 billion)

=== Wellness and healthcare ===
Assam Cancer Care Foundation is a joint partnership between the Government of Assam and the Tata Trusts. Tata Trust said that setting up of six cancer hospitals and laying the foundation stone of seven new cancer hospitals has raised Assam in terms of higher level of healthcare and treatment of cancer not experienced by other states of the country.

In Assam investor summit, Indo-UK Institute of Health announced that it will set up a medical city in Guwahati at cost of ₹1600 crore ($231 million).

== See also ==
- Chinese made Ganesha idols
- Production Linked Incentive schemes in India
- PM MITRA
