= Department for Promotion of Industry and Internal Trade =

Governance institution in India

The Department for Promotion of Industry and Internal Trade (DPIIT) is a government department under India's Ministry of Commerce and Industry. It formulates and implements promotional and developmental policies to support industry growth, in line with the national priorities and socio-economic objectives. While individual administrative ministries handle the production, distribution, development, and planning aspects of their allocated industries, DPIIT oversees India's industrial policy. It is also responsible for facilitating and increasing the foreign direct investment into the country.

The department, in its current form, was established on 27 January 2019 by replacing the erstwhile Department of Industrial Policy & Promotion to add promotion of internal trade as one of its mandate. The current Minister is Piyush Goyal.

== History ==
The department was originally established in 1995, and was reconstituted in the year 2000 with the merger of Department of Industrial Development.

DPIIT is the nodal Department in Government of India for coordinating and implementing programmes with the United Nations Industrial Development Organization (UNIDO) in India. The department also coordinates with apex Industry Associations such as Federation of Indian Chambers of Commerce and Industry, Confederation of Indian Industry, ASSOCHAM, Internet and Mobile Association of India (IAMAI) in their activities relating to promotion of industrial cooperation and to stimulate FDI into India.

== Responsibilities ==
=== Stimulating investments ===
==== New industrial policy ====
It is currently working to frame a new industrial policy, to be the third such policy in India since its independence in 1947. However, the deadline for completing the policy has been repeatedly pushed back since January 2018.

==== India Investment Grid ====
The department has created an online portal called the India Investment Grid (IIG), an interactive investment portal providing details of sectors, states and projects in which domestic and foreign investors may sink in capital. in association with Invest India, India's national investment and facilitation agency. The initiative not only allows investors across the globe to easily search, identify and track investment worthy projects, but also allows promoters to highlight their projects along with requirements like funds, technology and collaboration needs with global audience.

=== Boosting startup growth ===
The department is the nodal body for the Startup India initiative, which aims to make India a hub for startups. It aims to discard restrictive States Government policies within this domain, such as License Raj, Land Permissions, Foreign Investment Proposals, and Environmental Clearances.

According to the government, the focus areas include reduction in patent registration fees, freedom from mystifying inspections for first 3 years of operation, freedom from Capital Gain Tax for first 3 of operation, as well as self-certification compliance.

The government has loosed the norms for startups and their backers to seek exemption from Angel Tax, but the tax remains. Almost 14,000 startups have been registered by DPIIT through its portal.

=== Framing e-commerce rules ===
The department is currently framing the e-commerce policy, a set of rules aimed at streamlining and regulating the digital business ecosystem.

=== Intellectual property rights ===
DPIIT is also responsible for intellectual property rights relating to patents, designs, trademarks, copyrights, layout-designs of integrated circuits, and geographical indication of goods, and oversees the initiative relating to their promotion and protection.

== Initiatives ==
=== Bhaskar ===
This is a startup ecosystem registry to help startups. Bhaskar is aimed to foster a dynamic and inclusive environment for innovation and entrepreneurship. The initiative is designed to bring together a diverse array of stakeholders—ranging from entrepreneurs and government bodies to investors and academic institutions—onto a single, integrated platform.
