= Electronics and semiconductor manufacturing industry in India =

India's electronics and semiconductor manufacturing industry includes designing, assembling, testing, and fabricating electronic goods, components, and integrated circuits. Domestic semiconductor fabrication was effectively absent for years after the state-owned semiconductor facility at Mohali, operated by Semiconductor Complex Limited, was crippled by fire in February 1989. Following the incident, the facility did not restart production until eight years later, in 1997.

Under the India Semiconductor Mission (ISM), which carried an outlay of ₹76,000 crore (equivalent to ₹780 billion or US$8.1 billion in 2026), the government claimed to have approved 12 manufacturing units with committed investment of ~₹1.64 lakh crore (equivalent to ₹1.7 trillion or US$18 billion in 2026). Of these 12, three—Micron, Kaynes Semicon, and CG Semi—have begun commercial production. The Union Cabinet approved a successor programme, Semicon 2.0, in July 2026 with a total budget outlay of ₹127,500 crore (US$13 billion).

In September 2026, at the Semicon India conference in New Delhi, U.S. based LAM Research announced an investment of ₹10,000 crore to establish India’s first semiconductor component manufacturing unit, positioning the country as an export hub for chipmaking equipment and parts.

At the same event, Prime Minister Narendra Modi inaugurated new semiconductor packaging facilities in Surat, Gujarat, and Mohali, Punjab.

India is the world's second-largest producer of mobile phones by volume. The Ministry of Electronics and Information Technology claimed that handset output grew from ₹18,900 crore (equivalent to ₹310 billion or US$3.2 billion in 2026) in 2014-15 to ₹6.27 lakh crore (US$65 billion) in 2025-26. Electronic merchandise is India's 3rd-largest export category, with exports of ₹4.2 lakh crore (US$44 billion) in 2025-26.

The industry's expansion has drawn sustained scrutiny. Economists and analysts, including former Reserve Bank of India governor Raghuram Rajan, have questioned how much value India adds, given that imported components make up over 80% of Indian-assembled electronics, and have debated the fiscal cost, protectionist policies, and design of the subsidies used to attract manufacturers.

== Electronics industry ==
=== Statistics and trends ===
==== Market-size ====
India's electronic sector, which ranks among the world's largest in terms of consumption, is expected to increase from $69.6 billion in 2012 to $400 billion by 2020. It was primarily driven by an increase in demand, which was expected to expand at a compound annual growth rate of over 25% during that time. Imports accounted for 65% of the demand for electrical products in 2013–14. A Frost & Sullivan-IESA data analysis indicates that 60% of total electronic usage can be attributed to five high priority product categories. These are, in descending order, desktop computers (4.39%), laptops (5.54%), mobile phones (38.85%), and flat panel display televisions (7.91%).

The consumer electronics and appliance industry in India, which was valued at $9.7 billion in 2014, is expected to increase at a compound annual growth rate of 13.4% to reach $20.6 billion by 2020. Set-top boxes are expected to increase at the quickest rate among consumer electronics, with Y-o-Y growth of 28.8% forecast between 2014 and 2020. Televisions will grow at the rate of 20%, refrigerators at 10%, washing machines at 8–9%, and air conditioners at roughly 6-7%. India's demand for IT devices was projected to be worth $13 billion in 2013. By 2029–2030, it is estimated that India's aerospace and defense (A&D) electronics sector might be valued up to $70 billion, of which $55 billion could come from electronics used in platforms that need to be purchased and the other $17–18 billion from system-of-system initiatives.

==== Domestic production ====
In 2023, the total value of electronic goods produced domestically was $101 billion. India's electronics hardware manufacturing sector is expected to generate at least $278 billion in electronic goods by 2030. India produced 4% of the world's electronics gear in FY23. With 31% of the entire production of electronic goods in India in FY13, the communication and broadcasting equipment industry held a leading position, followed by consumer electronics at 23%. In the April–June quarter of 2015, 24.8% of the cellphones transported into the nation were either assembled or made in India, an increase from 19.9% the quarter before.

Out of the 220 million mobile sets that were shipped in India in 2015–16, 110 million of those units were either manufactured or assembled there in the past year, up from 60 million the year before. The value of mobile handset production increased by 185% in 2015–16, from ₹19,000 crores to ₹54,000 crores. Turning the Make in India initiative into a reality for the electronics and hardware sector was the title of an ASSOCHAM-EY research. It predicted that the Indian electronics and hardware industry will develop at a CAGR of 13%–16% in 2013–18, from a level of $75 billion in 2016 to $112–130 billion by 2018.

In May 2016, an NITI Aayog research stated that India's electronics sector contributes just 1.7% of GDP, but in Taiwan, South Korea, and China, it accounts for 15.5%, 15.1%, and 12.7% of GDP, respectively. India now makes up less than 5% of the global electronics manufacturing sector, with the majority of its electronics production going towards the country's own market.

In 2014, the percentage of localized input/value addition in televisions was approximately 25–30% due to the importation of panels, semiconductors, and glass required for the production of LCD/LED TVs. Due to the importation of the compressor, refrigerant, motor, and coil, the localization of air conditioners was only approximately 30% to 40%. About 35–40% of the parts used in set-top boxes came from within the country. For refrigerators and washing machines, the localized content was approximately 70%. It is stated that in 2016, the percentage of localized value addition created in mobile phone assembly in India was barely 2-8%.

The Ordnance Factory Board's Opto Electronics Factory (OLF), located in Dehradun, is a unique facility in India that produces opto-electronic goods for defense use Polymatech Electronics, located in Chennai, is another facility that produces Opto Semiconductor Chips. The Company signed MoU with Government of Tamil Nadu on 27 May 2020. The project was also acknowledged under SPECS program. Hon'ble Prime Minister of India has visited Polymatech Electronics at Semicon India 2023 Samsung, a leading Korean electronics company, intends to begin producing laptops at its Noida plant in India in 2024. Airport navigation aids are presently produced worldwide by Thales Reliance Defence Systems, a joint venture electronics company of Thales Group, while Bharat Electronics-Thales Systems, based in Bangalore, produces high-tech items like low-band receivers for the Dassault Rafale's electronic warfare suite. On 18 January 2024, Grupo Antolin inaugurated a new production plant in Chakan for electronics, Human-Machine Interface systems, and advanced lighting. In India, Grupo Antolin provides parts to Volkswagen, Škoda Auto, Suzuki, Toyota, Mahindra & Mahindra, and Tata Motors.

Lenovo intends to increase its manufacturing and is considering producing servers in India in order to benefit from the production-linked incentive (PLI) program for IT hardware. In 2024, Samsung Electronics intends to begin producing laptops at its Noida plant. Already, preparations are in motion. Intel showcased a comprehensive range of Made in India laptops and IT goods, including locally made servers, during the India Tech Ecosystem Summit 2024. By Q2 2024, Google has instructed vendors to begin producing Pixel smartphones in India. The production line for Google's high-end Pixel 8 Pro will be ready first. In India, Dixon Technologies is going to manufacture Google Pixel 8 smartphones. September 2024 will see the release of the first batch into the market. Monthly production of Pixel smartphones is expected to reach 100,000 devices, with 25–30% of those units going toward export.

Apple Inc. plans to begin producing AirPods in India from 2025. With Jabil in Pune, the business has begun producing wireless charging case parts on a trial basis. Parts of AirPods wireless charging cases are already being produced by Jabil and delivered to China and Vietnam.

==== Exports and imports ====
India was a net importer of electronics as of 2016, with China accounting for the majority of India's imports. Electronics had surpassed gold in 2015 and ranked second in terms of value among all imports into the nation, right behind crude oil. India spent more money on semiconductor imports than on oil, according to research published in 2019 by Professor Vikram Kumar, an emeritus professor of physics at IIT Delhi. According to a Ministry of Commerce and Industry report, one of the six industries that could assist India in reaching over 70% of its target of $1 trillion in goods exports by FY30 is electronics.

As per Economic Survey 2026, electronics has grown from India's seventh largest export category in fiscal year 2022 to become second largest in FY2026. The country has already exported $22.2 billion of electronics by 29 January 2026 for FY2026. This was backed by the expansion was the mobile manufacturing segment which rose from ₹18,000 crore (US$2.81 billion) in FY2015 to ₹5.45 lakh crore (equivalent to ₹5.6 trillion or US$58 billion in 2026) in FY2025.

==== Exports ====
The estimated value of India's electronics exports in FY13 was $7.66 billion, down slightly from $8.15 billion in FY12; however, due to the depreciation of the rupee, they increased in INR terms during the same time, rising from ₹44,000 crore to ₹46,300 crore. India's electronics exports were dominated in 2013–14 by the telecom sector, which was followed by computing, consumer electronics, instruments, and electronic components. The increasing demand for Indian electronics items overseas is believed to be mostly driven by advancements in technology and competitive cost-effectiveness. Indian exports of electronic gear nearly doubled in value from ₹109,940 crores in 2009–10 to ₹196,103 crores in 2013–14, measured in rupees. India's electronics exports fell to $6 billion in FY14, accounting for 0.28% of the world's electronics trade.

India recorded a 22.24% growth in electronics exports, exceeding the $20 billion milestone within the nine months of the FY 2023-24. Between April and December 2023, mobile phone exports—which made up 52% of all electronics exports—reached $10.5 billion. Notably, the iPhone became the main export engine during this time, accounting for 35% of all electronics exports and an astounding 70% of all mobile exports from the nation. The value of iPhone exports topped $7 billion only in December 2023. the nearly seven-fold increase in mobile exports, which went from $1.6 billion in FY19 to $11.1 billion in FY23. In the same time frame, total electronics exports increased by almost three times, from $8.4 billion in FY19 to $23.6 billion in FY23.

During their results call for the December quarter in 2023, Indian companies such as Havells, Dixon Technologies, Voltas, and Blue Star stated that they are building a foundation for exports to industrialized nations such as the US and those in Europe. Havells intends to supply air conditioners in the US market after establishing a company there. About 28–30% of Motorola smartphone output is now sent to the US as Dixon Technologies increases its exports of the devices. Appliance retailer Arçelik, which markets appliances in Europe under the Beko name, has placed export orders with Voltas for frost-free refrigerators and dishwashers. India exported $29.12 billion worth of electronics in 2023–24, a 23.6 percent increase over the previous year. The United States, United Arab Emirates, Netherlands, United Kingdom, and Italy are the top five export markets for electronics goods. Exports also expanded into new markets in FY24, including Turkmenistan, Honduras, El Salvador, Mongolia, Montenegro, and the Cayman Islands. Limited amounts of semiconductor chips packaged at Tata Electronics' Bengaluru R&D Center are now being exported to partners in the US, Europe, and Japan. Currently, these packed chips are under the trial program.

For the US and European markets, Foxconn and Padget Electronics will produce the pro and base versions of the Pixel smartphone, respectively, along with other Google devices. Foxconn's Sriperumbudur factory has already begun trial production. Full-scale manufacturing is scheduled to begin in September 2024.

According to the Economic Survey 2026, electronics has grown from India's seventh largest export category in fiscal year 2022 to become third largest in FY2025. The survey was presented to the Indian Parliament on 29 January 2026. Further, electronics export had already touched $22.2 billion in the running fiscal year 2026, making it the second largest exports category just after petroleum products. The major reason for the expansion was the mobile manufacturing segment which rose from ₹18,000 crore (US$2.81 billion) in FY2015 to ₹5.45 lakh crore (equivalent to ₹5.6 trillion or US$58 billion in 2026) in FY2025, marking a 30-fold increase in a decade. The expansion from two mobile production units to over 300 moved India from being a net importer to second-largest mobile manufacturer.

==== Imports ====
In 2012–13, 2013–14, and 2014–15, the estimated total value of electronic products imports was ₹1,79,000 crore (US$28 billion), ₹1,95,900 crore (US$31 billion), and ₹2,25,600 crore (US$37 billion), respectively. Based on data from the Ministry of Commerce and Industry, the importation of phones surged dramatically from $665.47 million in 2003–04 to $10.9 billion in 2013–14. Over the same time period, phone imports from China increased from $64.61 million to $7 billion. China was responsible for 67% of India's $23.5 billion electronics trade imbalance in 2013–14. Electronics imports could reach $40 billion in FY16, up from about $28 billion in FY11. In 2016, local electronics production started to grow, signaling the start of a recovery during a period of low Indian exports. Electronic exports increased by 7.8% to $0.5 billion in January 2016, while electronic imports, which made up 27% of India's annual trade imbalance, decreased by 2.2% to $3.2 billion.

=== Government initiatives ===
To promote overall growth and open job opportunities, projected to be more than 28 million by attracting investments worth $100 billion, the Indian central government has sought to reduce the country's electronics import bill from 65% in 2014–15 to 50% in 2016 and gradually to a net-zero electronics trade by 2020. India has pursued a two-pronged strategy of import substitution and export encouragement, through the Make in India campaign coupled with the Digital India campaign, the Startup India and the Skill India campaigns. The government has fostered an environment conducive to foreign direct investment (FDI) inflow in several ways, as outlined in the National Electronics Policy and the National Telecom Policy.

- Increased liberalisation of Foreign Direct Investment (FDI): 100% FDI through an automatic route.
- Relaxation of tariffs.
- Establishment of Electronic Hardware Technology Parks (EHTPs) and Special Economic Zones (SEZs).
- Implementation of Preferential Market Access (PMA).
- Imposing basic customs duties on certain items falling outside the framework of the IT free trade agreement.
- Exempting import-dependent inputs/components for PC manufacturing from a Special Additional Duty (SAD).
- Incentivising the export of certain electronics goods in the Focus Products scheme under the Foreign Trade Policy.
- Funding 3000 PhD students in electronics and IT across the Indian universities.
- Imposing an education cess on imported electronic products for parity.
- To offer incentives of up to $1.7 billion by 2020 to electronics hardware manufacturing entities setting up shops in India to help offset the disadvantages of developing the new industry in the country, a Modified Special Incentive Package Scheme (MSIPS) has been initiated. The government has approved 40 proposals worth over INR9538 crore between January 2014 and June 2015 under the scheme.
- The establishment of greenfield and brownfield Electronic Manufacturing Clusters (EMCs) is encouraged under the EMC scheme. Some 200 EMCs are projected by 2020, of which 30 are already in the process of establishment.

The National Institution for Transforming India (NITI Aayog), a policy think-tank under the Indian central government, has suggested in a draft report that a policy be adopted to provide a tax holiday for ten years to firms investing US$1 billion or more that also create 20,000 jobs. The report, hinting at a policy tilt toward the Information Technology Agreement-2 (ITA -2), also suggests that India should re-strategize its defensive policies regarding Free Trade agreements (FTAs) and aggressively pursue export-oriented policies to utilize these FTAs as opportunities to obtain duty-free access to the electronics markets of its FTA partners.

The Indian government launched Digital India futureLABS on 3 February 2024, with the aim of doing research and development in the areas of automotive, computer, communication, industrial electronics, strategic electronics, and internet of things. Funding will originate from the Ministry of Electronics and Information Technology's R&D budget. The primary organization for creating the general strategy, SOPs, and guidelines for new businesses and other private sector enterprises engaged in those fields would be the Centre for Development of Advanced Computing (C-DAC).

=== Investments in the electronics sector ===
Between April 2000 and March 2016, the electronics industry in India attracted $1.636 billion in foreign direct investment (FDI) (equity capital component only; this amount excludes funds remitted through the Reserve Bank of India's NRI schemes). This represents 0.57% of the total FDI equity inflow that the nation received during the same period, totaling $288.51 billion.

As of February 2016, the India Electronics and Semiconductor Association (IESA), a group that supports domestic production of computer hardware and electronic goods in India, reported that the government had received 156 proposals with investment commitments totaling INR1.14 lakh crore, or $16.8 billion, over the preceding 20 months. As of May 2016, the government had approved 74 applications totaling ₹ 17,300 crores out of 195 investment proposals costing ₹ 1.21 lakh crore, while 27 projects had been rejected. As of June 2016, the Indian electronics industry anticipates US$56 billion in investments over the following four years to reach its 2020 export target of over US$80 billion. As of August 2016, 37 mobile manufacturing companies have invested in India during the previous year, resulting in the creation of 40,000 direct jobs and around 125,000 indirect jobs.

Foxconn has pledged investment worth $5 billion to set up R&D and electronic manufacturing facilities in India within the next five years. In January 2015, the Spice Global signed an MoU to set up a mobile phone manufacturing unit in Uttar Pradesh with an investment of ₹5 billion (US$52 million). In January 2015, Samsung contemplated a joint public-private initiative under which 10 "MSME-Samsung Technical Schools" will be established in India. In February, Samsung announced that it will manufacture the Samsung Z1 in its plant in Noida. In addition to mobile phones, Samsung's factories in Noida and Sriperumbudur produce appliances and consumer electronics such as refrigerators, LED televisions, washing machines, and split air conditioners. In February 2015, Huawei opened an R&D center in Bengaluru with an investment of US$170 million. It is also setting up a telecom hardware manufacturing plant in Chennai, which has been approved by the central government. In February 2015, Xiaomi began initial talks with the Andhra Pradesh government to begin manufacturing smartphones at a Foxconn-run facility in Sri City. In early August 2015, the company announced that the first manufacturing unit was operational within seven months after it was conceived. In August 2015, Lenovo commenced operations at a smartphone manufacturing plant in Sriperumbudur, run by the Singapore-based contract manufacturer Flextronics International Limited. The plant has separate manufacturing lines for Lenovo and Motorola, as well as separate quality assurance and product testing functions. Taiwan's major contract manufacturer, Wistron, which makes devices for companies such as BlackBerry, HTC and Motorola, announced plans in November 2015 to manufacture the devices at a new factory in Noida, Uttar Pradesh. In December 2015, Micromax announced that it would set up three new manufacturing units in the Indian states of Rajasthan, Telangana and Andhra Pradesh at a cost of ₹3 billion (US$31 million). The plants may become operational in 2016, each employing 3,000-3,500 people. Phone manufacturer Vivo began manufacturing smartphones in December 2015 at a plant in Greater Noida, employing a workforce of 2,200 people.

The US-based personal computing hardware multinational Dell Technologies, is looking to expand its capacity to export from India, at its laptop and computer manufacturing factory in Sriperumbudur, where it previously invested US$30 million. Dell has plans of investing in the tunes of US$300 million through its venture fund arm Dell ventures, in Indian start-ups working in cloud computing, security and analytics as well as in the manufacturing of microprocessors and photovoltaic cells. Chennai-based Munoth Industries has partnered with China's Better Power for technological support as it aims to set up India's first Lithium-ion cell manufacturing plant in Tirupati in three phases by 2022 with an investment of ₹799 crores. The first phase of the project will be complete by 2019 and the latter phases by 2022. The plant is expected to generate 1,700 job opportunities. The company has invested ₹165 crore for the first phase, in which it would draw a capital investment of ₹25 crore from the Central Government under the Make In India scheme. The state government of Andhra Pradesh also will provide fiscal and operational incentives, including subsidies on taxes and power costs. The company intends to sell finished lithium ion cells to mobile phone manufacturers and battery pack manufacturers in India. Together, MEL Systems and Services, Syrma SGS, O/E/N India, Sahasra Group, and Deki Electronics launched a new company called Awesense Five in February 2024. Its goal is to develop and produce industrial sensors in India, reducing reliance on imports and capturing the ₹7,000 crore domestic market, which includes the defence sector.

The first commercial supercapacitor production facility in India has been established by KELTRON in Kannur. Chief Minister Pinarayi Vijayan officially opened it on October 1, 2024. The company has been collaborating on technology development with ISRO, the Naval Materials Research Laboratory, and the Centre for Materials for Electronics Technology. With an expenditure of ₹18 crore, the production facility's first phase has been established. In due time, the total investment will be ₹42 crore. The production capacity is approximately 2000 pieces per day.

== Semiconductor industry ==
With the advancements of the Internet of Things (IoT) has led to increased attention on Indian semiconductor industry and manufacturing, and its role in the country's development.

=== Statistics and trends ===
The fast growing electronics system design manufacturing ( ESDM ) industry in India has design capabilities with the number of units exceeding 120. As stated by the Department of Electronics and Information Technology (DeitY), approximately 2,000 chips are being designed in India every year with more than 20,000 engineers currently employed to work on various aspects of IC design and verification. According to a NOVONOUS report, the consumption of semiconductors in India, mostly import-based, is estimated to rise from $10.02 billion in 2013 to $52.58 billion by 2020 at a dynamic CAGR of 26.72%. The report estimates that the consumption of mobile devices will grow at a CAGR of 33.4% between 2013 and 2020, driving the share of mobile devices in semiconductor revenue up from 35.4% in 2013 to 50.7% in 2020. Moreover, the telecom segment is also expected to rise at a CAGR of 26.8% during 2013-20. The information technology and office automation segment are estimated to grow at a CAGR of 18.2% in the same period. The consumer electronics segment also is expected to grow at a CAGR of 18.8% over the seven years. The automotive electronics segment is expected to grow at a 30.5% CAGR from 2013 to 2020. The EDSM industry will also grow on the back of these high consumption-led industries. Currently, almost all the semiconductor demand is met by imports from countries like the USA, Japan, and Taiwan. In the semiconductor sector, India has a significant human-capital pool which is currently concentrated in design, in the absence of an end-to-end manufacturing base. But the nascent ESDM segment in India is premised on competent domestic research by Indian universities and institutes across the entire semiconductor manufacturing value chain; namely, chip design and testing, embedded systems, process-related, EDA, MEMS and sensors, etc., which have contributed to a voluminous number of research publications.

=== Initiatives in the semiconductor industry ===
As of 2016, the government allows 100% FDI in the Electronics system manufacturing and design (ESDM) sector through an automatic route to attract investments including from Original Equipment Manufacturers (OEMs) and Integrated Device Manufacturers (IDMs), and those relocating to India from other countries, in addition to EMC, MIPS and other incentives and schemes provided to the electronics sector.

The Department of Electronics and Information Technology (DeitY), in line with Skill India campaign has launched an ₹ 49 crore scheme for capacity building in ESDM. In October 2015, Infineon Technologies, a German semiconductor firm partnered with National Skill Development Corporation (NSDC) to enhance skill and manpower in semiconductor technology, aimed at boosting the ESDM ecosystem in India.

The India Electronics & Semiconductor Association (IESA) has announced a SPEED UP and SCALE-UP of its talent development initiative to be implemented through the Centre of Excellence with the Electronics Sector Skills Council of India (ESSCI) and an MoU with the Visvesvaraya Technological University (VTU) and the RV-VLSI Design Center to build human capital in the ESDM field. ESSCI, which has developed over 140 Qualification Packs (QP) / National Occupation Standards (NOS) across 14 sub-sectors of which Embedded System Design and VLSI are key domains absorbing engineers, established their first-ever Centre of Excellence (CoE) at BMS college of Engineering for VLSI and embedded system design. IESA signed an MoU with Taiwan Electrical and Electronic Manufacturers' Association (TEEMA) to encourage co-operation in technology and knowledge transfer and investment commitment to the domestic ESDM sector that can benefit both Indian and Taiwanese companies. IESA also entered into a MoU with Singapore Semiconductor Industry Association (SSIA) in February 2015, with an objective to forge trade and technical cooperation tie-ups between the electronics and semiconductor industries of both the countries.

The Department of Electronics and Information Technology (DeitY) has established an Electronics Development Fund (EDF) managed by Canara Bank ( CANBANK Venture Capital Funds or CVCFL) to provide risk capital and to attract venture funds, angel funds and seed funds for incubating R&D and fostering the innovative environment in the sector., the establishment of "Fund of Funds for Start-ups" (FFS) approved by the union cabinet as part of the EDF for contribution to various alternative investment funds or daughter funds, registered with Securities and Exchange Board of India which would extend funding support to start-ups, in line with the Start-up India Action Plan unveiled by Government in January 2016, will be beneficial to the start-ups in the ESDM space, according to IESA.

The National Centre for Flexible Electronics (NCFlexE) at IIT Kanpur, the National Centre for Excellence in Technology for Internal Security at IIT Bombay and the Centre for Excellence for Internet of Things at NASSCOM, Bengaluru has been set up to promote the development of national capability in ESDM.

=== Recent notable achievements ===
In 2011, Hyderabad based semiconductor chip design services entity SoCtronics completed the first 28 nm design chip to be developed in India. Bangalore-based Indian company Navika Electronics has designed GNSS/GPS SoC (System on Chip) chipsets based on ARM core processors under its own brand name for portable applications like receiving/down conversion and amplification of GPS and Galileo signals.

The Centre for Nano Science and Engineering (CeNSE), IISc, Bengaluru, in collaboration with KAS Tech, a Bengaluru-based electronics manufacturing company, has developed 'Ocean', a highly integrated and portable chemical vapour depositor that can commercially produce various two dimensional materials including graphene, in an easy 'plug and grow' approach which can have various novel applications in the ESDM sector, for both academia and industry alike.

In what could be viewed as a breakthrough for the country's electric automobile programme as well as indigenous electronics manufacturing, ISRO and the Automotive Research Association of India (ARAI) together have developed and validated through tests, using ISRO's state of the art cell technology, a lithium-ion battery prototype for application in electric vehicles and looks forward to commercialising the technology through mass production by partnering with automotive companies. Currently India's lithium-ion battery requirements are completely met by import as there is no domestic manufacturing of these batteries. While the raw material for the batteries still has to be imported, the rest of the value chain can be synthesized domestically at a competitive cost, if the project clears all the barriers. Researchers at the Indian Institute of Technology - Bombay (IIT-B), in a collaboration with ISRO's Semi-Conductor Labs (SCL), Chandigarh, have developed an indigenous Bipolar Junction Transistor (BJT) which can function with Bi-CMOS (Bipolar Complementary Metal Oxide Semiconductor). Analogue or mixed chips based on various digital Bi-CMOS technology with integrated analogue high frequency BJT based amplifiers are essential for IoT and space applications like high frequency communications as they reduce form factor, power consumption, weight and size dimensions and cost etc.

During the Digital India FutureLABS Summit 2024, technologies for a CMOS-based vision processing system, a Thermal Smart Camera, and a Fleet Management System were distributed to 12 industries as part of Ministry of Electronics and Information Technology's InTranSE Program. A digital signal processor included inside the Thermal Smart Camera allows it to do a variety of AI-based analytics. Applications in smart cities, industry, defense, and healthcare are its main focus. With a potent on-board computing engine, the Industrial Vision Sensor iVIS 10GigE is a CMOS-based vision processing system designed to handle the demands of the upcoming industrial machine vision applications. The Fleet Management System tracks the position of vehicles and sends out notifications for a variety of situations, including reckless driving, overspeeding, ignition, idling, and stopping. It will also help improve the dependability of public transportation services by reducing the occurrence of bus bunching, as transit operators can employ operational techniques for headway reliability as a dynamic scheduling decision support tool.

=== Investments in Semiconductor Industry in India ===
In 2014, the ESDM industry was projected to see investment proposals worth ₹ 10,000 crores (USD $1.5 billion) over the next two years, along with five partially state-funded start-up incubation centres of the 250 planned by the industry body, as per IESA.

In February 2014, the union cabinet approved setting up these fabrication proposals with the decision to extend incentives as follows:

- 25% subsidy on capital expenditure and tax reimbursement under M-SIPS Policy.
- Exemption of Basic Customs Duty (BCD) for non-covered capital items.
- 200% deduction on expenditure on R&D under Section 35(2AB) of the Income Tax Act.
- Investment-linked deductions under Section 35AD of the IT Act.
- Interest free loan of around ₹ 5,124 crore to each.

Starting January 1, 2022, the government started taking applications under its incentive scheme in developing a full ecosystem for the chip manufacturing industry and expects at least a dozen semiconductor manufacturers to start setting up local factories in the next several years.

The Ministry of Finance has proposed a 71% increase in funding to ₹13,104.50 crore for the manufacturing of chips and electronics in the 2024 Union budget of India.

In 2024, the Government of India has approved the establishment of four semiconductor manufacturing units in the country as part of the Semicon India Programme. Additionally, nine projects have received approval under the Scheme for Promotion of Manufacturing of Electronic Components and Semiconductors (SPECS). These initiatives are expected to generate approximately 15,710 jobs, significantly contributing to the growth of the semiconductor and electronics sectors in India.

The Uttar Pradesh government is actively working to establish the state as a prominent hub for semiconductor manufacturing. Currently, it has received four to five investment proposals amounting to ₹40,000 crore. This initiative coincides with the upcoming three-day Semicon India 2024 event, highlighting the state's commitment to advancing its capabilities in the semiconductor sector.

==== Investments in fabrication plants in India ====
As of mid 2016, there were no operational commercial Semiconductor fabrication plants in India.

The Centre of Excellence in Nanoelectronics (CEN), at the Indian Institute of Technology – Bombay, has a lab-like fabrication facility collaborated between IIT Bombay and IISc Bangalore that offers research in the design, fabrication and characterization of traditional CMOS Nano-electronic devices, Novel Material based devices (III-V Compound Semiconductor devices, Spintronics, Opto-electronics), Micro Electromechanical Systems (MEMS), NEMS, Bio-MEMS, polymer based devices and solar Photovoltaics to researchers across academia, industry and government laboratories, all over India. The center also offers support in device fabrication technologies using sophisticated equipment under the Indian Nano Users Program (INUP) and acts as a linchpin for developing innovative technologies that can be tweaked and commercialized for spurring the nano-industrial growth in India.

A foundry for producing GaN nano material proposed to be extended around the existing facility for producing gallium nitride transistors, at the IISc's Centre for Nano Science and Engineering (CeNSE), Bangalore, at a cost of ₹ 3000 crore has received preliminary approval from the central government.

- Gujarat is expected to be home to one of the semiconductor wafer fabrication manufacturing facility by late 2017 in Prantij of Sabarkantha district. To be set up by anchor partner Hindustan Semiconductor Manufacturing Corporation (HSMC) and co-partners STMicroelectronics N.V. (France/Italy) and Silterra (Malaysia), it will employ a workforce of over 25,000 including 4,000 direct employees. The group will establish two manufacturing units at an expense of over ₹ 29,000 crore or about US$4.5 billion, each capable of producing 20,000 wafers per month. Technology nodes currently proposed by this consortium are 90, 65 and 45 nm nodes in Phase I and 45, 28 and 22 nm nodes in Phase II. In March 2016, HSMC received ₹700 crore worth of seed investment for the project from Mumbai-based private equity fund Next Orbit Ventures (NOV).
- Another consortium, led by Jaiprakash Associates in collaboration with IBM and Tower Semiconductor, proposed to build a wafer fabrication facility in Greater Noida at an expense of over ₹34,000 crore or about US$5 billion, capable of producing 40,000 300 mm-diameter wafers per month in an advanced CMOS with 90, 65 and 45 nm CMOS nodes initially before gradually switching over to 28 nm and 22 nm CMOS nodes in later phases. As of April 2016, the fate of the project remains uncertain as to the debt-ridden lead partner, JPA, exited the project, citing the commercial infeasibility of the project. In 2022, International Semiconductor Consortium (ISMC), a joint venture between Abu Dhabi-based Next Orbit Ventures and Tower Semiconductor, announced that it had signed a memorandum of understanding (MoU) with the Government of Karnataka to set up a 65-nanometer analog semiconductor fabrication unit. ISMC will invest $3 billion to set up the plant. Tower Semiconductor has put in a fresh proposal for $8 billion chip production facility in 2024. On 5 September 2024, Government of Maharashtra approved an investment proposal of ₹83,947 crore ($10 billion ) for a joint venture between Tower Semiconductor and the Adani Group that will establish chip manufacturing plant in Panvel. In the first phase, the plant's capacity will be 40,000 wafers per month (WPM), and it will eventually be expanded to 80,000 WPM.
- SunEdison and Adani Group have signed an MoU to build the largest vertically integrated solar photovoltaic fabrication facility in India with an investment of up to US$4 billion in Gujarat's Mundra, creating 4,500 direct jobs and more than 15,000 indirect jobs by integrating all aspects of solar panel production on site, including polysilicon refining and ingot, cell, and module production.
- The U.S.-based company called Cricket Semiconductor has evinced interest in investing US$1 billion in building an analog integrated-circuit and power supply integrated-circuit specific semiconductor fabrication facility in Madhya Pradesh.
- With a $2.75 billion investment, Micron Technology began construction of its semiconductor manufacturing plant in Gujarat, in September 2023.
- The partnership between HCLTech and Foxconn for an OSAT (outsourced semiconductor assembly and testing) plant was announced in January 2024. Foxconn, which invested $37.2 million, will own 40% of the company. With HCL Group, Foxconn set aside ₹1,200 crore as a down payment for the building of a chip facility in India. It released a call for bids in February 2024 for construction of chip assembly and testing plant.
- Murugappa Group would invest $791 million over a five-year period to enter the semiconductor assembly and testing business.
- To establish a semiconductor assembly and testing facility in India, CG Power and Industrial Solutions has partnered with Renesas Electronics America and Stars Microelectronics, based in Thailand. As equity capital of the joint venture, CG Power, Renesas, and Stars will invest up to $205 million, $15 million, and $2 million in one or more tranches. This amounts to about 92.34 percent, 6.76 percent, and 0.9 percent, respectively. Chips for consumer, industrial, automotive, and power applications will be produced with a daily capacity of 15 million units.
- At a cost of ₹91,000 crore, Tata Electronics and Powerchip plan to establish a semiconductor fabrication facility in Dholera. It is expected to be able to process 50,000 wafer starts per month (WSPM). Using 28 nm technology, this facility will manufacture power management ICs, display drivers, micro-controllers, and high-performance computing chips for AI, automotive, computing and data storage, and wireless communication technologies. Tata Electronic and Synopsys to work together at Dholera semiconductor fabrication facility. Tata Electronics plans to leverage Synopsys' foundry design platform to expedite the process of customizing semiconductor products for its clientele. The two firms will also work together in the fields of data analytics, computer-aided design, factory automation, product design kits that Synopsys will offer to Tata Electronics, and the creation of intellectual property for chip fabrication. Tokyo Electron will equip Tata Electronics workers and provide training so that the company can meet its 2026 chip manufacturing target on schedule. The partnership covers both back-end packaging technologies and front-end manufacturing. Additionally, Tokyo Electron will fund continuous R&D and enhancement projects.
- In Morigaon, Tata Semiconductor Assembly and Test intends to establish a semiconductor plant. ₹27,000 crore will be needed to establish this facility. Chips for use in automotive, consumer electronics, telecom, mobile phones, and electric vehicles will be assembled with a capacity of 48 million units per day. The Jagiroad plant will become operational from 2025.
- A group of European businesses and RRP Electronics have partnered to establish an Outsourced Semiconductor Assembly and Testing (OSAT) facility in Maharashtra. On 23 March 2024, it intends to lay the cornerstone of its new 25,000 square foot facility.
- The Indian government approved the construction of the ₹3,307 crore Kaynes Technology ATMP unit in Gujarat on September 2, 2024. The facility would have a daily production capacity of 6.3 million chips. In addition, Kaynes SemiCon is investing ₹5,000 crore to develop an OSAT plant in Sanand.

==== Miscellaneous Investments in Semiconductor Industry ====
- Cyient Ltd. signed an agreement to acquire a 74 per cent equity stake in Rangsons Electronics Pvt Ltd, a Mysuru-based ESDM servicing firm.
- A US-based product engineering firm, Aricent, acquired Bengaluru-based chip design services company SmartPlay US$180 million.
- Altran Technologies SA, a French technology consulting multinational, agreed to acquire SiConTech, a Bengaluru-based start-up that designs semiconductor chips.
- In August 2013, AMD opened a new ESDM design centre in HITEC City, Hyderabad, in addition to its existing design centre in Bengaluru.
- The world's largest processor intellectual property technology vendor ARM expanded its VLSI operations out of Bengaluru as it set up a new Design Centre at Noida, Uttar Pradesh for working on planar and FinFET CMOS technologies under its physical IP division.
- Taiwan based Mobile phone chipmaker Mediatek opened a VLSI and embedded software design center at Techpark in Bangalore with a plan to invest $200 million to employ up to 500 engineers over the following few years for working on mobile communications, wireless connectivity & home entertainment segments.
- At SEMICON India 2026 in New Delhi, American semiconductor equipment maker Applied Materials announced plans to invest $5 billion in India over the following decade under an initiative it called "India Vision 2035", covering research, supply-chain expansion and workforce development, including a proposed 140-acre research park and a plan to expand its India-based supply-chain capacity roughly tenfold by 2035.

Critics and detractors of the fabrication projects currently underway in India, in different conceptual phases, doubt the prospects of success of these capital-intensive projects, pointing to various reasons like marginal profitability due to overcapacity of output in a saturated and fiercely competitive fabrication market, non-competence of these particular fabrication projects in terms of cost and performance related to the dimensions of CMOS nodes even in attracting domestic end-use industries which have access to the more sophisticated fabrication facilities outside the country, cost prohibitive maintenance and upgrades needed every few years to weather obsolescence, nonavailability of domestically procurable semiconductor-grade materials in absence of complementing ancillary manufacturing industries and other resource-intensive strings attached to such projects, including land acquisition requirements, necessity uninterrupted deionised water and power supplies, supply of critical gases such as nitrogen and argon, absence of skilled labour force and drain of an already inadequate number of experienced domestic talent pool in electronic engineering and R&D possessing expertise to overcome the barriers of related sensitive technologies for mass production towards other attractive sectors in absence of a major Indian player in the electronics sector, especially in a developing country like India, which is still grappling with infrastructural bottlenecks.

However, proponents of fabrication projects, such as AMD, stress the strategic need to develop fabrication facilities as part of an end-to-end electronics manufacturing base in India. Currently, India imports billions of dollars' worth of semiconductor nodes of 90 nm and above each year. Advocates call for investment by the central government towards long term growth in domestic manufacture of gallium nitride (GaN) and mercury cadmium telluride (HgCdTe) non silica semiconductors, citing a wide range of uses. GaN semiconductors, for instance, are used in High Electron Mobility Transistors (HEMTs), which can switch at high speed and handle high power and high temperature with a reduced need for cooling. HgCdTe semiconductors are used in high quality sensors for military space requirements.

== Assessment ==
=== Domestic value addition ===
The central question in assessing the industry is how much of the value of goods labelled "Made in India" is created in India. The Global Trade Research Initiative estimated in January 2024 that imported components account for about 90% of Indian-assembled smartphones, implying domestic value addition of roughly 10%. By July 2026, the India Cellular & Electronics Association put domestic value addition in mobile phones at 18 to 20%. In August 2026, the Secretary of the Ministry of Electronics and Information Technology, S Krishnan, stated that the government's target was 35 to 40%.

=== Design and cost of subsidies ===
Raghuram Rajan, Rohit Lamba, and Rahul Chauhan argued in 2023 that the central flaw in the Production-Linked Scheme for electronics manufacturing was that the subsidy accrued on finishing a phone in India rather than on value added, incentivising assembly rather than manufacturing. They attributed this design to WTO restrictions on linking payments to local content, and noted that once imported components are netted off, it is difficult to establish that net exports had risen.

The Takshashila Institution, a Bengaluru-based think tank, has argued that fiscal incentives alone are insufficient and that the government must combine its direction with private capital and market discipline for commercially viable investments; it noted that India's pre-2019 incentives remained substantially unchanged and failed to establish electronics and semiconductor manufacturing in India.

== See also ==
- Economy of India
- Foreign direct investment in India
- Stand-Up India
- Make in India
- Digital India
- Skill India
- Automotive industry in India
- Semiconductor industry in Taiwan
- Semiconductor industry in China
- List of semiconductor companies in the United States
