= VEGA Microprocessors =

Type of microprocessor developed in India

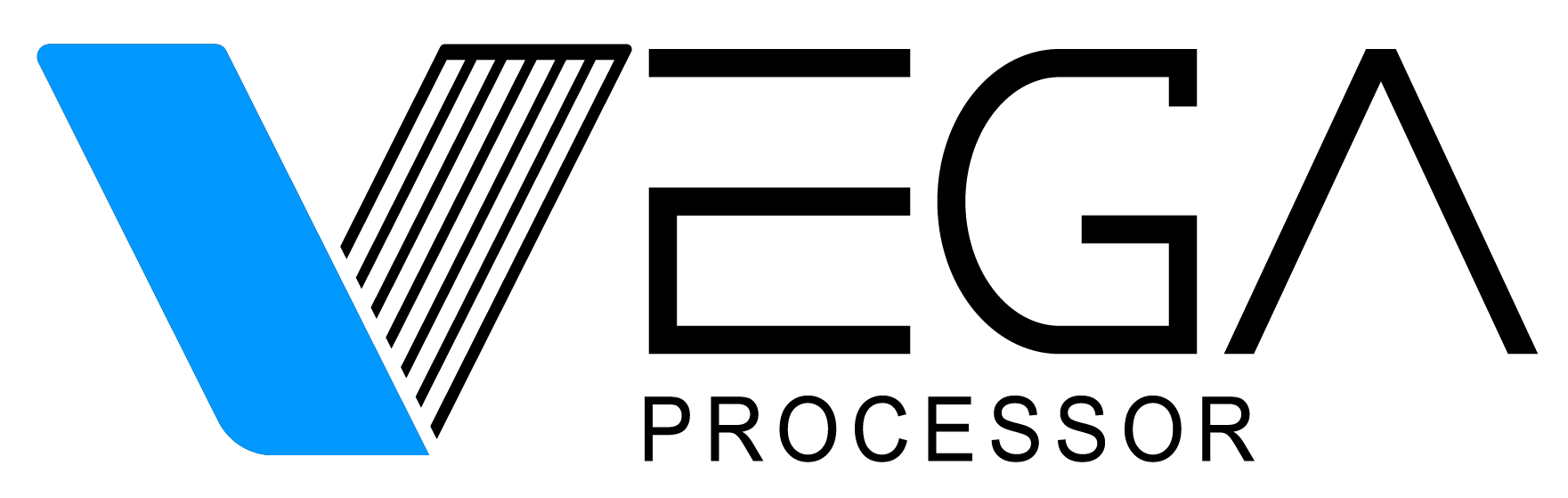
- VEGA Processor logo

General information
- Designed by: Centre for Development of Advanced Computing
- Common manufacturers: Semi-Conductor Laboratory; SilTerra

Architecture and classification
- Application: IoT, storage, smart NICs, edge analytics, data analytics, autonomous machines, networking
- Instruction set: RISC-V
- Variant: VEGA ET1031

VEGA Microprocessors (also known as VEGA Processors) is an initiative to develop a portfolio of microprocessors, and their hardware ecosystem, by the Centre for Development of Advanced Computing (C-DAC) in India. The portfolio includes several indigenously-developed processors based on the RISC-V instruction set architecture (ISA).

The India Microprocessor Development Programme (IMDP) was started by the Ministry of Electronics and Information Technology with the objective of designing a set of microprocessors, and developing a product line for commercial purposes, to be used as part of a "Make in India" strategy.

== Products ==
The initiative has developed the following product lines:

- VEGA microprocessors
- ASTRA interface controllers
- THEJAS system on a chip - integrating VEGA and ASTRA devices
- ARIES microprocessor development boards
- DHRUV microprocessor

=== VEGA ===
The initiative has developed 5 RISC-V microprocessors that run on FPGAs boards. The ET1031 is a 32-bit processor, with all other processors being 64-bit. Only the 32-bit variant has been physically manufactured within a THEJAS SOC.

Together with affiliated institutions, C-DAC seeks to acquire 10% of the microprocessor market in critical industries like space exploration and defense, where data security is crucial. C-DAC is developing a dual-core chip for high-end applications under the India Microprocessor Development Programme, and the chip is expected to be released in the second half of 2023. From 2024 forward, Dhanush64, Dhruv64, and Dhanush64+ will be released, followed by Octa-core in 2026. Beyond Octa-core, C-DAC chips will feature 48 or 64 cores once the microprocessor and high-performance computing processor programs have converged.

=== THEJAS ===
From the VEGA processor cores, 2 SOCs have been created running on the Digilent ARTY A7 FPGA. Only the THEJAS32 has been taped-out for manufacturing for the ARIES microcontroller boards. Silterra Malaysia is where THEJAS32 is manufactured. THEJAS64 is produced domestically at Semi-Conductor Laboratory.

==== Swadeshi Microprocessor Challenge ====
On December 7, 2021, the Ministry of Electronics and Information Technology honored the Swadeshi Microprocessor Challenge winners. At different phases of the challenge, participants get up to ₹4.40 crore in funding for the development of a hardware prototype and the incubation of a start-up by participating teams. C-DAC and IIT Madras made accessible for the challenge their SoCs, THEJAS32 (VEGA ET1031) and THEJAS64 (VEGA AS1061), based on VEGA 32-bit and 64-bit processors and Shakti. The participating teams successfully implemented the SoCs in a variety of designs. Ten teams became victorious from the 30 finalist teams. Team VEGA FCS FT (AI drone), received a ₹35 lakh cheque for their drone application; second-place winners, Team HWDL, received ₹30 lakh for FM Radio Data System Utilities; and third-place winners, Cytox, received ₹25 lakh for their "cell count" project. Each of the other teams received a check for ₹20 lakh for sharing fourth place. The teams are Astrek Innovations (lower limb exosuit for disabled), Team 6E Resources (remote monitoring and optimization of sewage treatment plant), Team Anshashodhak (unique calibration system for nuclear spectroscopy applications), Team Quicproc (wireless maternal monitoring system), Team Avrio Energy (AI Energy Meter with intelligence at edge and deep learning), and Team JayHawks (anti-theft geofencing based locking system).

Thirty finalist teams of the Swadeshi Microprocessor Challenge have been awarded incubation support by Maker Village, the largest electronic system design and production center in India.

=== ARIES ===
The ARIES microcontroller boards have been described by researchers as alternatives to Arduino Uno boards.

As of May 2023, the ARIES v3.0 board can be purchased for "around 1,000 Rs each, or about $12". It can be programmed with the Arduino IDE.

=== DHRUV ===
C-DAC created the 1.0 GHz, 64-bit dual-core DHRUV64 microprocessor. It is the third chip produced as part of the DIR-V Programme. In order to support both strategic and commercial applications, DHRUV64 will offer increased efficiency, improved multitasking capability, and dependability. It is appropriate for consumer electronics, automotive systems, 5G infrastructure, industrial automation, and the Internet of Things (IoT).

== Commercialization ==
On August 28, 2024, L&T Semiconductor Technologies (LTSCT) and C-DAC signed a memorandum of understanding (MoU). It will establish a program for the commercialization of cutting-edge technologies created by C-DAC in the areas of electric power systems, embedded software, free and open-source software operating systems, high-performance computing, and semiconductor design and development. LTSCT will leverage C-DAC's extensive pipeline of in-house intellectual property (IP), which includes the VEGA processor, to create global product prospects through application design and validation for field-programmable gate arrays. By facilitating the creation of cutting-edge goods and solutions for the automotive, industrial, information and communications technology infrastructure, and energy sectors, the collaboration to create indigenous ICs and SoCs based in Vega is expected to pick up speed.

== See also ==
SHAKTI Series - RISC-V microprocessor developed by IIT Madras
