= Esagu =

'eSagu' is a web-based personalized agro-advisory system which uses Information Technology to solve unscientific agricultural practices. Sagu means cultivation in the Telugu-local language of Telangana Andhra Pradesh, the region in which the project started. E-Sagu means electronic cultivation. It exploits the advances in Information Technology to build a cost-effective agricultural information dissemination system to disseminate expert agriculture knowledge to the farming community to improve crop productivity.

It is a joint research project of Media lab asia and IIIT Hyderabad

== Recognition ==
- eSagu was declared the best e-governance project at the Computer Society of India (CSI) and Nihilent e-Governance Awards for 2005-06 ([Nihilent e-Governance Awards https://www.csinihilent-egovernanceawards.org])
- eSagu features as a select entry among worldwide latest novel Internet applications in the book "Innovative Application Case study 2006" published by the Institute for Information Industry, a not-for-profit Think Tank for Taiwanese Ministry of Economic Affairs in Taipei.
- eSagu was listed as one of the top three e-Governance projects (the other two are BHOOMI and SAMPARK) of India in the video film on “Next e Governance Plan”, November 2005.
