= Prime Minister Internship Scheme =

Government Internship Scheme in India

Prime Minister Internship Scheme (PMIS)
- Type of project: Government Internship Scheme
- Country: India
- Prime Minister(s): Narendra Modi
- Ministry: Ministry of Corporate Affairs
- Key people: Nirmala Sitharaman
- Launched: 3 October 2024; 22 months ago Delhi
- Status: Active
- Website: pminternship.mca.gov.in

The Prime Minister Internship Scheme, also known as PM Internship Scheme (PMIS), is a government initiative launched by India in 2024 to provide internship opportunities to young citizens in leading companies across various sectors. Announced in the Union Budget 2024-25, the scheme aims to offer one crore (10 million) internships over five years in India's top 500 companies, designed to bridge the gap between academic learning and industry requirements. The scheme has been positioned by the Government of India as part of a broader strategy to make India the "Skill Capital of the World."

== Background and announcement ==
The scheme was announced as part of the Union Budget 2024-25 as one of five employment and skilling initiatives aimed at addressing youth unemployment in India. Finance Minister Nirmala Sitharaman described the program as part of a broader strategy to create a "Skilled and Employable Bharat" aligned with the "Viksit Bharat" vision. The government allocated ₹2,000 crore for the scheme in the financial year 2024-25.

== Program structure ==
=== Scope and duration ===
The PM Internship Scheme provides 12-month internships to participants aged 21-24 years who have completed at least secondary education. The program spans 24 sectors including oil, gas, energy, travel, hospitality, automotive, banking, and financial services. By October 2024, the scheme's portal showed 90,849 internship opportunities posted by 193 companies, including major private sector players such as Jubilant Foodworks, Maruti Suzuki India, Eicher Motors, Larsen & Toubro, Muthoot Finance, and Reliance Industries. Academic analysis indicates the scheme seeks to "bridge the gap between academic learning and practical job skills" while addressing employer concerns about graduates lacking real-world experience.

=== Financial support ===
Participants receive a monthly stipend of ₹5,000, with the government contributing ₹4,500 through Direct Benefit Transfer and participating companies providing ₹500 from their Corporate Social Responsibility funds. Additionally, interns receive a one-time grant of ₹6,000 upon joining. All participants are covered under government insurance schemes including Pradhan Mantri Jeevan Jyoti Bima Yojana and Pradhan Mantri Suraksha Bima Yojana.

== Implementation ==
=== Pilot phase (2024-25) ===
The pilot phase was launched on 3 October 2024, targeting 1.25 lakh internships. By December 2024, the scheme had received over 650,000 applications for 127,000 opportunities posted by 280 companies across 745 districts. The formal launch, initially scheduled for 2 December 2024, was delayed as officials worked to finalize selection processes for the overwhelming number of applications.

Major participating companies in the pilot phase included Tata Consultancy Services, Reliance Industries, HDFC Bank, Mahindra & Mahindra, Maruti Suzuki India, and Larsen & Toubro. Prime Minister Narendra Modi later formally launched the scheme, personally distributing joining letters to selected candidates.

=== Phase 2 expansion ===
Phase 2, launched in January 2025, expanded opportunities to over 1.18 lakh internships across 735 districts with 327 participating companies. This phase included both new opportunities and unfilled positions from the pilot phase.

== Company participation ==
Companies are selected primarily based on their average Corporate Social Responsibility (CSR) expenditure over the preceding three years, with the top 500 companies prioritized for participation. Training costs for interns are covered through company CSR funds, with up to 5% of CSR expenditure bookable as administrative costs. While participation is voluntary for companies, additional organizations may join with approval from the Ministry of Corporate Affairs.

== Eligibility and application ==
=== Eligibility criteria ===
Applicants must be Indian citizens aged 21-24 years who have completed at least secondary education, including ITI certificates, polytechnic diplomas, or graduation degrees. Candidates must not be engaged in full-time employment or education, though those enrolled in distance learning programs remain eligible.

The scheme excludes graduates from premier institutions such as IITs, IIMs, and National Law Universities, as well as those holding professional qualifications like CA, CMA, or MBBS. Additionally, candidates from families with annual income exceeding ₹8 lakh or those with immediate family members in government employment are ineligible.

=== Application process ===
Applications are submitted through an online portal at pminternship.mca.gov.in, which uses artificial intelligence tools to match candidates' data with companies' needs and locations. A dedicated mobile application was launched by Finance Minister Sitharaman in March 2025. The application process includes Aadhaar-based registration, eKYC verification, and allows candidates to apply for up to five internship opportunities per cycle.

== Performance data and outcomes ==
=== Phase 1 results (2024-25) ===
The pilot phase received significant response from eligible youth, with 621,000 applications submitted for 127,000 internship opportunities posted by 280 companies across 745 districts. According to Ministry of Corporate Affairs data, 487,000 eligible applicants completed their Know Your Customer (KYC) verification and registered on the portal during the October-November 2024 registration period.

Performance analysis by policy research organizations revealed significant implementation challenges. Despite 82,000 internship offers being made, only 28,000 candidates accepted the offers, and ultimately just 8,700 candidates actually joined their assigned internships—representing a participation rate of approximately 10.6%. No official explanation has been provided for the low conversion rate from offers to actual participation.

=== Evaluation and analysis ===
Policy research institutions have begun analyzing the scheme's effectiveness in addressing youth unemployment. The scheme targets a demographic where approximately 25% of Indian youth aged 15-29 are neither in education, employment, nor training, according to the 79th Round of the National Sample Survey. Early implementation data suggests challenges in converting application interest into actual program participation, with researchers noting the need for improved outreach and support mechanisms.

The scheme's five-year target of providing one crore internships will require substantial scaling from the pilot phase results. Academic analysis suggests that success will depend on addressing implementation gaps, improving industry collaboration, and enhancing support systems for participants to ensure higher completion rates.

== Challenges and criticism ==
Implementation of the scheme has faced several challenges identified through policy analysis and stakeholder feedback. Academic research has highlighted concerns about limited awareness among target demographics, with studies indicating "a significant gap between the scheme's objectives and students' awareness." The research focuses on students from top-ranked colleges in India and emphasizes the need for improved communication and outreach strategies to bridge the awareness gap.

During public consultation sessions organized by the Ministry of Corporate Affairs, prospective candidates raised concerns about the restrictive age limit, limited post-internship job prospects, and insufficient opportunities in the information technology sector. Participants requested extension of the upper age limit from 24 to 25 years and expansion of IT sector participation.

Analysis of implementation challenges has identified issues including resource constraints in government departments, varying quality of experiences across sectors, and procedural delays in bureaucratic processes. The low participation rate despite high application numbers has raised questions about program design and implementation effectiveness, with policy researchers suggesting the need for enhanced support systems and clearer communication of benefits to potential participants.

== Impact and assessment ==
For participating companies, the scheme offers access to "a vetted pool of motivated, skill-trained graduates" while providing "a scalable solution to entry-level talent acquisition." The scheme is designed to help companies address skill gaps while developing future workforce talent through structured training programs. However, early implementation data indicates that while companies are willing to offer positions, the actual uptake by candidates remains below projections, suggesting a need for improved program design and participant support mechanisms.

== Administration ==
The scheme is administered by the Ministry of Corporate Affairs through a dedicated PMIS Cell and is implemented by officers of the Indian Corporate Law Service (ICLS) cadre. A multilingual helpline (1800-116-090) has been established for grievance redressal, and the ministry conducts regular evaluation processes to recognize outstanding intern performance. The program operates separately from existing skill development, apprenticeship, and training schemes administered by other government departments.

== See also ==
- Employment in India
- Skill India
- Make in India
- Youth unemployment in India
- Corporate Social Responsibility in India
