= N. Veezhinathan =

- Born: January 21, 1938
- Died: June 9, 2024 (aged 86); Chennai, Tamil Nadu, India
- Education: University of Madras (PhD)
- Occupations: Philosopher, Sanskrit Scholar, Musicologist
- Known for: Advaita Vedanta, Navya-Nyaya, Head of Sanskrit Dept (University of Madras)
- Awards: President's Certificate of Honour (2002)

N. Veezhinathan (21 January 1938 – 9 June 2024) was a preeminent South Indian philosopher, prolific writer, and musicologist. He began his formal study of Sanskrit at the age of five, which culminated in a Ph.D. with a thesis focused on Advaita Vedanta.

His life and scholarship were deeply rooted in a century-long family connection with the Kanchi Matha. He was guided throughout his life by the Kanchi Paramacharya, who notably remarked that he remained alive solely to read the Gadadhari commentaries produced by Veezhinathan's mentor, N.S. Ramanuja Thathacharya.

== Academic career ==
Veezhinathan began his career as a lecturer in the Philosophy Department at the University of Madras. Under the influence of Dr. T.M.P. Mahadevan and Dr. Devasenapathy, he engaged deeply with Western philosophy, including the works of Martin Heidegger, Søren Kierkegaard, Bertrand Russell, and Frederick Copleston. This comparative exposure allowed him to articulate complex Advaitic thoughts in English for a global academic audience.

He later transitioned to the Sanskrit Department, eventually serving as the Head of the department until his retirement. His teaching covered the primary schools of Vedanta: Advaita, Dvaita, and Vishishtadvaita.

== Scholarship and Research ==
=== Navya-Nyaya and Commentaries ===
Veezhinathan spent 12 years studying Advaita under S. R. Krishnamurthi Sastri. He later gained a mastery of Navya-Nyaya (the "New Logic" school) under the celebrated N.S. Ramanuja Thathacharya (NSR Swami). He assisted NSR Swami in the transcription of commentaries for the Gadadhari texts and later authored the English introductions for these publications. He is credited with publishing commentaries for seven Gadadhari texts.

=== Editorial and Literary Work ===
With over 60 research papers to his credit, Veezhinathan was a prolific editor of classical manuscripts. His major editorial works include the Vakyarthadarpana of Ramatirtha Yati and the Vakyavrtti of Sankara (with the commentary of Ramananda).

He was a significant contributor to the New Catalogus Catalogorum (NCC) project, an international effort to document Sanskrit manuscripts, serving as an editor and author for the project at the University of Madras.

== Musicology ==
As a musicologist, Veezhinathan specialized in the spiritual and technical structures of Muthuswami Dikshitar's Krithis. He frequently conducted "lecture-demonstrations" supported by his family members, including his daughter Bharathi on vocals.

== Personal Life and Vows ==
In adherence to a spiritual directive and a lifelong vow of national service, Veezhinathan did not hold a passport and never traveled abroad. He was the father of V. Kamakoti, the Director of IIT Madras. He attributed his professional and spiritual stability to the "unwavering support" of his wife during the challenging formative stages of his career.

== Awards ==
- President's Certificate of Honour for Sanskrit (2002). This national award was conferred in recognition of his outstanding contribution to the field of Sanskrit scholarship.
