= Society for Applied Microwave Electronics Engineering & Research =

Autonomous R&D institute

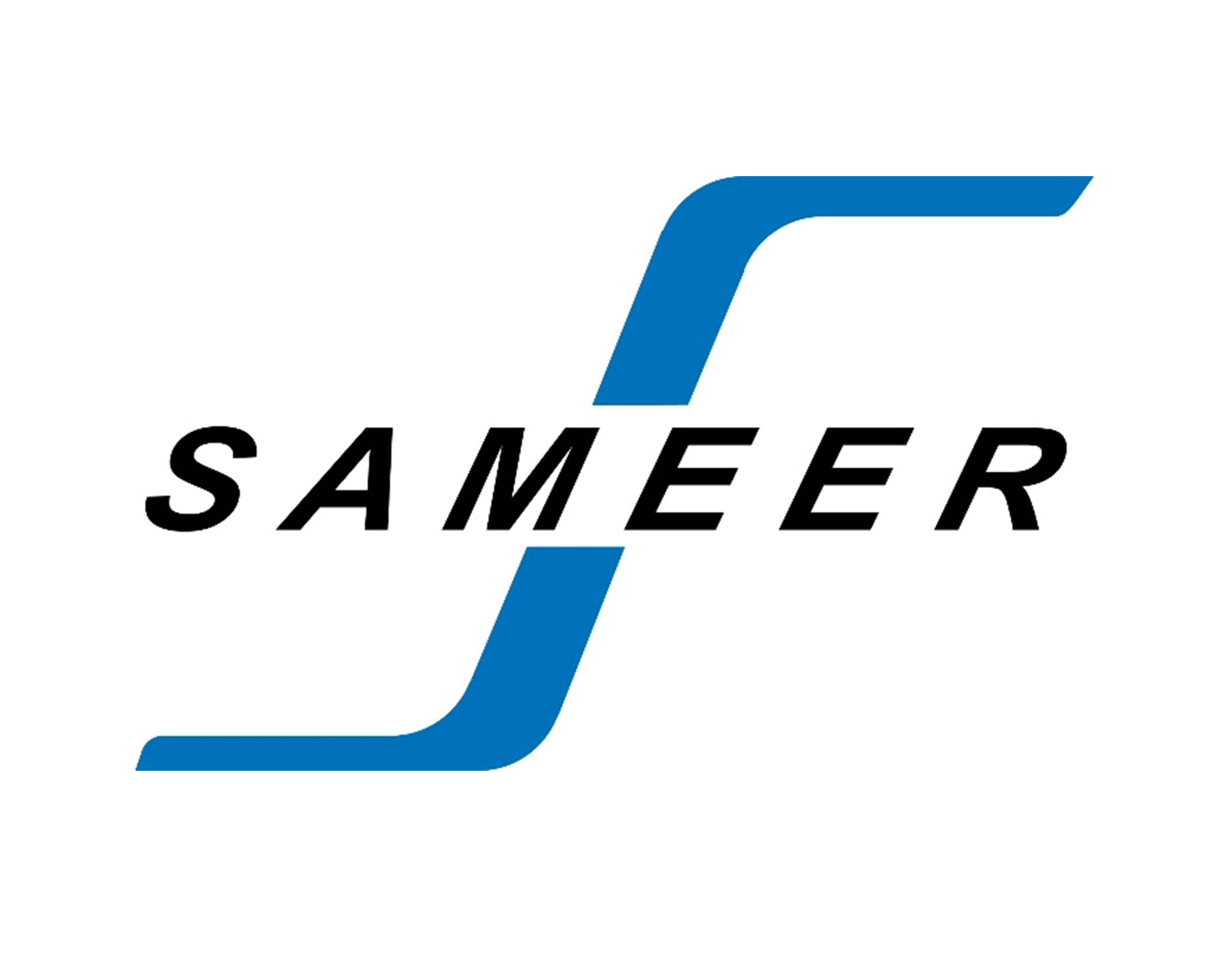
- Nickname: SAMEER
- Motto: Passion for Performance
- Established: 1984; 42 years ago
- Laboratory type: Research and Development
- Field of research: Microwave Engineering and Electromagnetic Technologies
- Director: Dr. P. Hanumantha Rao (Director General)
- Location: Hill Side IIT Bombay Campus area Powai Mumbai, India (headquarters) Maharashtra , 400076
- Operating agency: Ministry of Electronics and Information Technology, Government of India
- Website: https://sameer.gov.in/

Society for Applied Microwave Electronics Engineering & Research (SAMEER) is an autonomous research and development institution under the Ministry of Electronics and Information Technology (MeitY), Government of India. It was originally founded in 1984 as a laboratory under the then Department of Electronics and is an offshoot of the Microwave Engineering Group at the Tata Institute of Fundamental Research, Mumbai. In 1988, it relocated to its headquarters within the IIT Bombay campus.

Conference from Dr. P. Hanumantha Rao, Director General of SAMEER

A memorandum bag of the institution

SAMEER at Defence & Aerospace SES 2025, BIEC

== History ==
- 1977 – The Special Microwave Products Unit (SMPU) was established at TIFR, Mumbai.
- 1984 – SAMEER Mumbai was formally constituted from SMPU as an autonomous R&D unit under the Department of Electronics.
- 1987–88 – The Chennai Centre (Centre for Electromagnetics, originally established in 1983) was merged into SAMEER in 1987, and the Mumbai unit moved to IIT Bombay campus by 1988.
- 1994 onwards – Expansion to centres in Kolkata (Millimeter‑Wave Centre), Visakhapatnam (Electromagnetic Environmental Effects), and Guwahati (High‑Power Microwave Technology).

== Research areas ==
SAMEER's mission is to advance application‑oriented research in RF, microwave, millimeter‑wave electronics and electromagnetics, enabling development of indigenous technologies to reduce dependence on foreign imports. Its core research and service areas include:

- Linear accelerators for medical therapy (LINAC)
- Medical imaging technologies (e.g., indigenously developed 1.5 T MRI)
- Radar and atmospheric instrumentation.
- Electromagnetic Interference & Compatibility (EMI/EMC), Electromagnetic Environmental Effects.
- Photonics, optoelectronic systems and thermal management engineering.
- Secure communications, antennas and millimeter‑wave subsystems.
- Quantum technology and next‑generation telecom platforms (5G/6G).

== Centres ==
- SAMEER Mumbai – Headquarters at IIT Bombay; active in medical electronics, optoelectronics, MRI, atmospheric remote sensing, radar instrumentation, electromagnetic compatibility and more.
- Chennai Centre (CEM) – Specialized in Electromagnetics, EMI/EMC, antenna engineering, thermal management, and 5G/6G systems research.
- Kolkata Centre (Millimeter‑Wave) – Established in 1994; focuses on millimeter‑wave systems including CATR-based antenna testing.
- Visakhapatnam Centre (CE3) – Focused on Electromagnetic Environmental Effects (E3), EMI/EMC/EMP testing and strategic-level evaluation.
- Guwahati Centre (CHMTCT) – Based at IIT Guwahati; specializes in high‑power microwave tube and component technology.

== Recent highlights ==
- In March 2025, AIIMS New Delhi signed a memorandum of understanding with SAMEER to collaborate on indigenous MRI and linear accelerator development under the national Indigenous MRI (IMRI) Mission.
- On 10 August 2024, MeitY’s R&D Institute SAMEER signed a Transfer of Technology (ToT) agreement with two private firms for its Microwave‑Based Brix Measurement System (also called the SCORE system) to measure sugar concentration (Brix) rapidly and non‑destructively in sugar mills during production.
- In December 2023, SAMEER, along with IIT Madras and IIT Kanpur, licensed an indigenous 5G RAN sub-system developed at the national 5G Test Bed to Tejas Networks for ₹12 crore (US$1.2 million).
