= Cyient =

Global multinational technology company

- Formerly: Infotech Enterprises Limited
- Type: Public
- Traded as: BSE: 532175; NSE: CYIENT
- ISIN: INE136B01020
- Industry: Information technology Electronics
- Founded: 1991; 35 years ago
- Founder: B. V. R. Mohan Reddy
- Headquarters: Hyderabad, India
- Area served: Worldwide
- Key people: Sukamal Banerjee (CEO)
- Revenue: ▲₹7,147 crore (US$740 million) (FY24)
- Operating income: ▲₹986 crore (US$100 million) (FY24)
- Net income: ▲₹702 crore (US$73 million) (FY24)
- Number of employees: 10,000+ (2018)
- Subsidiaries: Cyient DLM
- Website: www.cyient.com

Cyient (formerly Infotech Enterprises Limited) is an Indian multinational technology company that is focused on engineering, manufacturing, data analytics, networks and operations. It was established in 1991 in Hyderabad as Infotech Enterprises Ltd. Infotech Enterprises was re-branded as Cyient in 2014.

== History ==
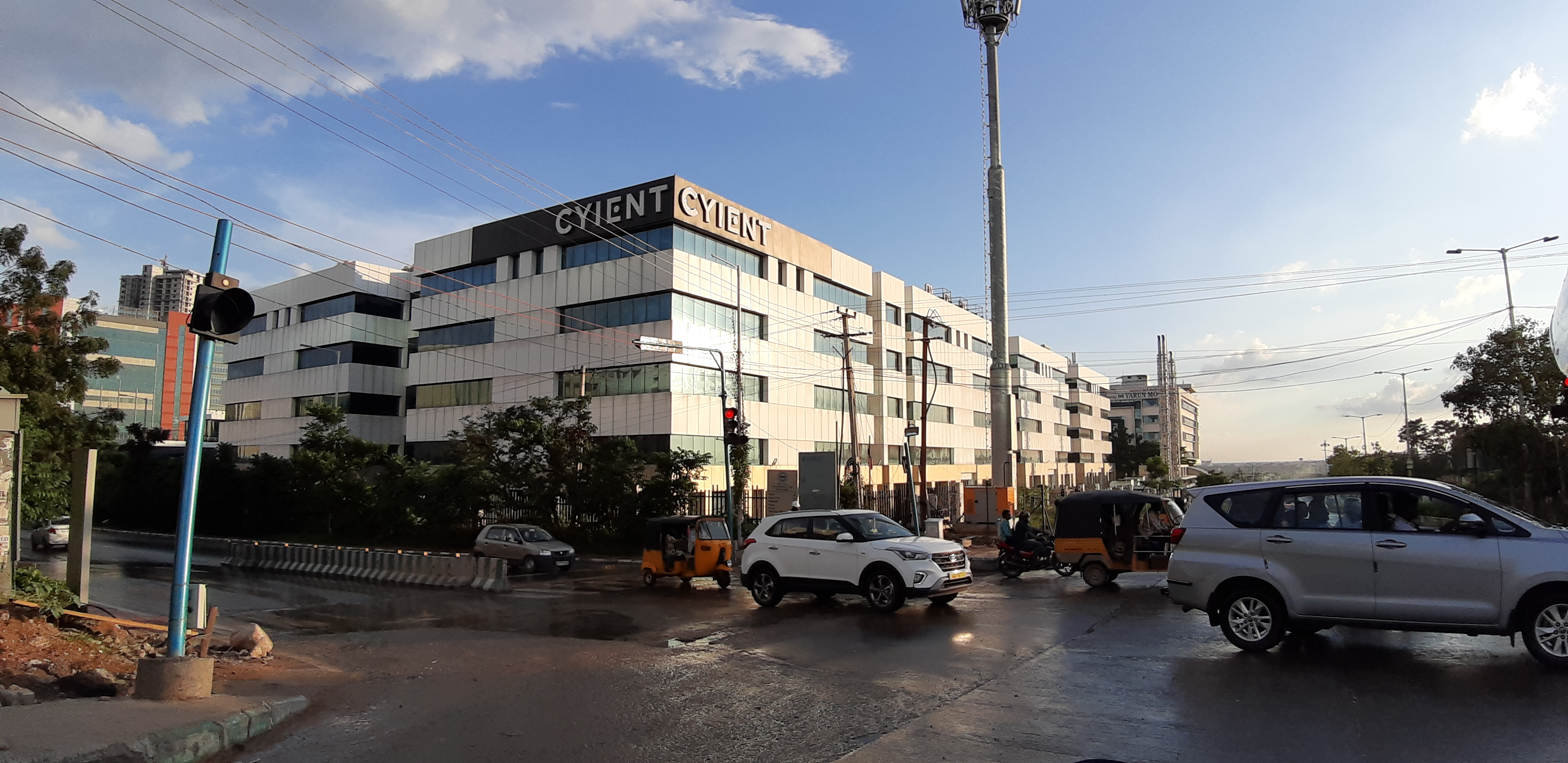
Cyient office in Manikonda, Hyderabad

Cyient was established as Infotech Enterprises Ltd in 1991 in Hyderabad by B. V. R. Mohan Reddy. In 1995, the company received its first ISO 9002 certification from BVQi London for its conversion services. Infotech Enterprises started to provide engineering service outsourcing, but found immediate opportunity in the GIS arena.

Infotech Enterprises became a public limited company in 1997, had an IPO of equity shares at ₹ 20/- per share and listed in all major stock exchanges in India. Around 1999, it signed a breakthrough contract to provide GIS conversion and consultation mapping services worth US$5.5 million to US based Analytical Surveys, Inc. Within the same year, the company acquired Cartographic Sciences from Analytical Surveys, Inc. In June 1999, the company acquired Dataview Solutions Limited, a UK based GIS Software Company. The company continued to pursue engineering services, and won a major engineering services contract with an aircraft engine manufacturer in 2000.

In 2000, Infotech announced the acquisition of a German company, Advanced Graphics Software GmbH (AGS), a mechanical engineering software and services company specialising in 3D CAD/CAM. In 2002, Infotech announced a strategic business relationship with the Pratt & Whitney division of United Technologies Corporation. Pratt & Whitney participated in a preferential offer and obtained an 18.4% equity stake in Infotech.

In 2005, Infotech acquired Tele Atlas India Pvt Ltd. Tele Atlas parent company joined as a strategic partner with preferential allotment of shares. Company founder, B V R Mohan Reddy, was elected Chairman of the Confederation of Indian Industry (CII) Southern Region in 2008. In January 2010, Daxcon was acquired by Infotech Enterprises America Inc, a wholly owned subsidiary of Infotech Enterprises Limited India.

Infotech Enterprises adopted the Cyient name in 2014 after approval from a shareholders' vote. The process of determining the new identity, bearing connotations to the words client and science, while Cyient referencing Infotech Enterprises, involved various brand specialists, and the new name was tested in 17 languages. After changing its name, Cyient relocated its US headquarters in Connecticut to a new building. It acquired Softential, Inc in 2014. Cyient also acquired Invati Insights in 2014, with the new entity named Cyient Insights.

In 2015, Cyient acquired Pratt & Whitney Global Services Engineering Asia. In 2015, Cyient acquired a 74% stake in Rangsons Electronics, a Mysore-based systems integrator and small series manufacturing firm. The Rangsons division was renamed to Cyient DLM. On February 8, 2017, Cyient Inc. agreed to acquire Certon Software Inc.

On April 25, 2022, Cyient announced to acquire the Finnish plant and product engineering services company Citec. Shortly after, on June 6, 2022, Cyient also announced the acquisition of Portuguese wireless engineering services company Celfinet.

In June 2023, Cyient's electronics manufacturing services subsidiary Cyient DLM launched its IPO and got listed on NSE and BSE.

In October 2024, Cyient acquired Altek Electronics.

== Operations ==
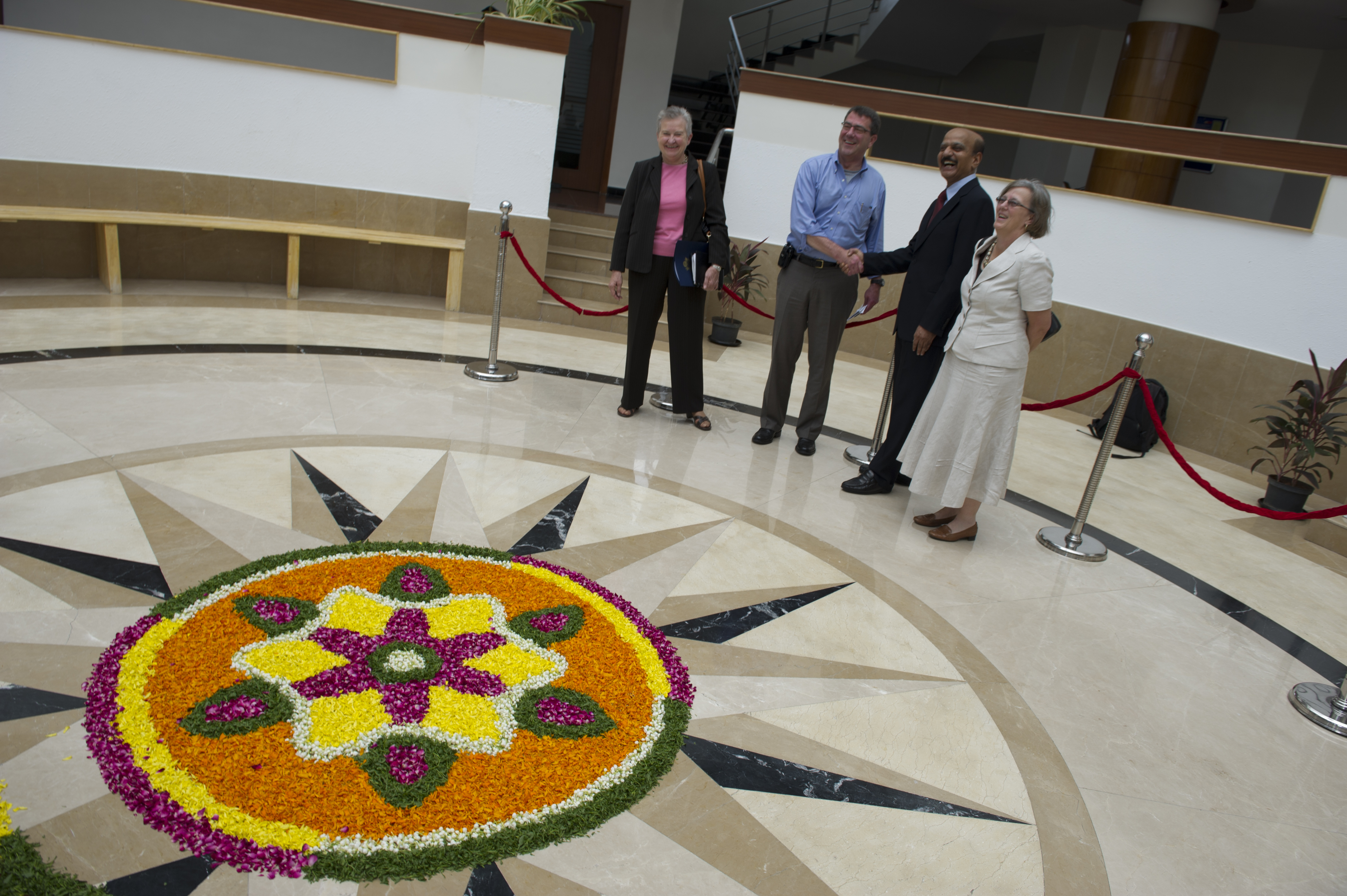
U.S. Ambassador to India Nancy Powell and Deputy Secretary of Defense Ashton B. Carter are welcomed to Cyient by Mohan Reddy, chairman and managing director, and U.S. Consul General Katherine Dhanani; Hyderabad, July 2012.

Cyient Limited as of 2014 provides "software-enabled engineering & geographic information system (GIS) services." In February 2017, Cyient had around 14,000 employees in 21 countries in Asia, Europe, and North America.

In January 2017, Cyient opened facilities at the Incubation Centre of the Telangana State Industrial Infrastructure Corporation in Warangal, also began to build a 70,000 square feet Technology Development Centre at Madikonda Special Economic Zone in Warangal. In February 2017, Cyient and ANSYS agreed to set up a simulation lab at Cyient's facility in Hyderabad to develop proof-of-concepts.

Cyient acquired 74 percent equity stake in Rangsons Electronics Pvt Ltd in February 2015 and renamed it to Cyient DLM. The Mysuru-headquartered Rangsons Electronics, is an electronics system design and manufacturing (EDSM) services company. It is the 2nd largest electronics manufacturer after Dixon Technologies.

With its United States headquarters in the state of Connecticut, in return for a pledge to add 85 jobs to the state, in February 2017, Cyient Inc. in East Hartford received a $500,000 loan from the state Department of Economic and Community Development for new machinery and equipment. At the time, Cyient was a supplier to Connecticut engine builders and employed 456 full-time workers in Connecticut.

== See also ==
- List of companies of India
- List of Indian IT companies
- Software industry in Telangana
- Information technology in India
- Electronics and semiconductor manufacturing industry in India
