= B. V. R. Mohan Reddy =

Indian businessman

Padma Shri Mohan Reddy Venkat Rama Bodanapu Gundaa
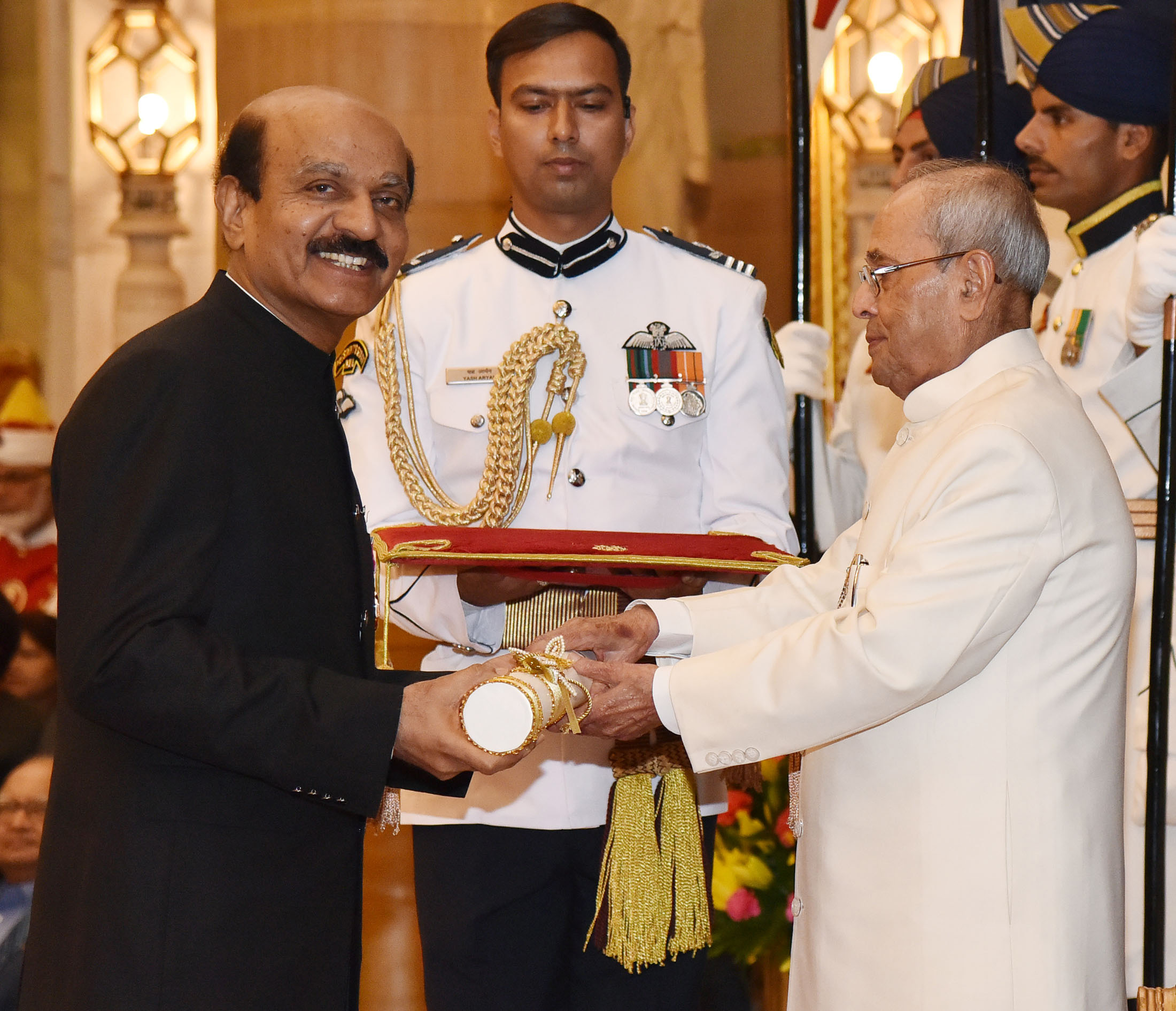
- The President, Sushri Pranab Mukherjee presenting the Padma Shri Award to Shushri Mohan Reddy Venkat Rama Bodanapu Gunda
- Born: 12 October 1950 (age 75); Mahabubnagar
- Citizenship: Indian
- Education: Andhra University; Indian Institute of Technology, Kanpur; University of Michigan
- Occupation: Chairman of Cyient (formerly Infotech Enterprises)
- Board member of: Cyient
- Spouse: Sucharita

B. V. R. Mohan Reddy (born 12 October 1950) is an Indian business executive and engineering manager who founded and served as Executive Chairman of Cyient. He joined the DCM Group in 1974, and has subsequently worked with MICO Bosch, HCL, and OMC Computers Limited. He was the Chairman of NASSCOM from 2014 to 2015, and is a business analyst.

== Early life and education ==
BVR Mohan Reddy was born on 12 October 1950 in Mahbubnagar, Mahbubnagar District, Telangana. Mohan holds a graduate degree in Mechanical engineering from the College of Engineering, Kakinada, India, and postgraduate degrees from the Indian Institute of Technology, Kanpur and the University of Michigan. He has also received an honorary Ph.D. from the Jawaharlal Nehru Technological University, Hyderabad; an honorary D.Sc. from the Andhra University, Vishakhapatnam; and Doctor of Science Honoris Causa from KL University (Koneru Lakshmaiah Education Foundation), Vaddeswaram.

== Career ==
Mohan started his career with the DCM group (Shiram Refrigeration), where he contributed to the assembly line operations in Diesel Engine production. After leaving the DCM group, he worked with MICO Bosch and then HCL, before joining OMC computers as managing director. Mohan founded Cyient as Infotech Enterprises in 1991, and he currently serves as the executive chairman of the company.

He has also been a member of the NASSCOM Executive Council since 2003 and served as the Chairman of the Confederation of Indian Industry (CII), southern region (2008–2009). Reddy also serves as chairman, Board of Governors of IIT Hyderabad and IIT Roorkee; member on the Board of NIIT University, Neemrana; and member of Centre for Innovation and Entrepreneurship at IIIT Hyderabad.

== Awards ==
- The Golden Peacock Award for Lifetime Achievement and Leadership in Technological Innovations by the Institute of Directors (IOD)
- 24th ICSI Lifetime Achievement Award
- Dr. BVR Mohan Reddy, has been inducted into the 'Geospatial Hall of Fame' at the Geospatial World Forum (GWF) 2022
- Hyderabad Management Association awarded him the "Entrepreneur of the year" for 1992
- HYSEA Outstanding Contribution Award in 1997
- Ernst & Young presented him the "Outstanding Entrepreneur Award" in 1999
- ASME Leadership Award
- Honorary Doctorate - JNTU, Hyderabad
- Distinguished Alumni Award - IIT, Kanpur
- Hyderabad Management Association awarded him the "Life Time Achievement Award" for the year 2015
- Shared Services Forum, New Delhi felicitated him as "Pioneering Business Leader in Global India" in the year 2016
- Padma Shri award 2017 in Trade & Industry.

== Honors ==
- Former Chairman NASSCOM
- Vice Chairman NASSCOM
- Chairman, Board of Governors, IIT Hyderabad
- President of Electronic Industries Association of Andhra Pradesh (ELIAP)
- President of Hyderabad Software Exporters Association (HYSEA)
- Vice Chairman of the CII-AP Chapter.
- Chairman of CII (AP State Council)
