= Digital India Corporation =

Digital India Corporation (DIC)
- Type: Section 8 company
- Predecessor: Media Lab Asia
- Founded: 2013; 13 years ago
- Founder: Ministry of Electronics and Information Technology (MeitY)
- Headquarters: Registered Office:** Electronics Niketan Annexe, 6 CGO Complex, Lodhi Road, New Delhi-110003 **Noida Office:** Express Corporate Park, 6th Floor, Plot No. 15, 16, Film City, Sector 16A, Noida, Uttar Pradesh – 201301
- Key people: Shri. Akhil Kumar, IPS Managing Director & CEO
- Website: dic.gov.in

Digital India Corporation (DIC) is an Indian not-for-profit company established by the Ministry of Electronics and Information Technology (MeitY), Government of India, under Section 8 of Companies Act 2013. The organization is currently responsible for the Information Technology Research Academy and Visvesvaraya PhD scheme in electronics and information technology.

== Research focus ==
Digital India Corporation started with the projects such as World Computer (affordable computing and access devices), Bits for All (low cost, high bandwidth connectivity) and Tomorrow's Tool (rurally relevant applications). It later switched to application development, including information and communications technology for healthcare, education, livelihood and empowerment of the disabled. Since then, Digital India Corporation has taken up 75 development projects. After development, the new technology is taken from the lab to pilot testing, and then for large scale deployment through a scheme of provider/user membership.

== Functional model ==
Digital India Corporation utilises a way of growth by working with a network of research academic and private organisations for undertaking development work. It serves as a research hub for the Indian Institutes of Technology. The other partners are a combination of academic and industry research and development institutions, non-governmental organisations, and governmental agencies. The projects are sponsored by corporate bodies, non-profits and the government. The list of project partners has grown to more than 58.
