= V. Kamakoti =

Indian computer scientist and academic administrator

- Born: Veezhinathan Kamakoti; Chennai, Tamil Nadu, India
- Education: Indian Institute of Technology Madras
- Known for: SHAKTI (microprocessor)
- Awards: Padma Shri (2026)
- Scientific career
- Fields: Computer science
- Workplaces: Indian Institute of Technology Madras

Veezhinathan Kamakoti is an Indian computer scientist and academic administrator who has been serving as the Director of the Indian Institute of Technology Madras since January 2022. He is a professor in the Department of Computer Science and Engineering at IIT Madras and is known for his work in computer architecture, information security, and VLSI design.

== Early life and education ==
Kamakoti completed his postgraduate (M.S.) and doctoral (Ph.D.) degrees in Computer Science and Engineering from the Indian Institute of Technology Madras.

== Career ==
Kamakoti joined the faculty of Indian Institute of Technology Madras in 2001. Over the years, he has held several administrative positions at the institute, including roles related to research and national-level examinations.

He assumed office as the Director of IIT Madras in January 2022, succeeding Bhaskar Ramamurthi.

== Research and contributions ==
Kamakoti's research areas include computer architecture, secure systems engineering, and VLSI design.

He is best known for leading the development of the SHAKTI (microprocessor), an indigenous open-source microprocessor initiative based on the RISC-V architecture, developed at IIT Madras.

The SHAKTI project aims to build production-grade processors and systems-on-chip to promote self-reliance in semiconductor technology.

== Awards and honours ==
Kamakoti has received several recognitions for his contributions to technology and academia, including:

- Padma Shri (2026)

== See also ==
- Indian Institute of Technology Madras
- SHAKTI (microprocessor)
