= Centre for Materials for Electronics Technology =

Autonomous scientific society

- Established: 1990; 36 years ago
- Field of research: Electronic materials and devices
- Director: Dr. R. Ratheesh (Director General)
- Location: Pune, India (headquarters)
- Nickname: C-MET
- Operating agency: Ministry of Electronics and Information Technology, Government of India
- Website: https://cmet.gov.in/

Centre for Materials for Electronics Technology (C‑MET) is an autonomous scientific society under the Ministry of Electronics & Information Technology (MeitY), Government of India. C‑MET is dedicated to advancing R&D in electronic materials and devices, aiming to enhance self‑reliance in materials and technology for strategic and industrial applications using indigenous resources.

== Activities ==
=== Research and Development ===
C‑MET works on advanced electronic materials including thick films, specialty polymers, ultra‑pure and refractory metals, semiconductors, ceramics, and composites. Key research areas include nanomaterials, integrated electronics packaging (e.g. LTCC), piezo‑sensors, energy materials, and e‑waste recycling technology.

=== Integrated Electronics Packaging ===
Since 2006, the Pune Lab has developed Low Temperature Co‑Fired Ceramic (LTCC) materials and fabrication facilities, including a ~200 m³ Class 10000 clean room and indigenous LTCC tapes and pastes for high‑density packaging used in microwave, aerospace, MEMS and IC packaging applications.

=== E‑Waste Management & RoHS Testing ===
C‑MET’s Hyderabad laboratory hosts India’s only Ministry‑supported RoHS testing facility, accredited by NABL (as per ISO 17025:2005) and recognized by BIS. The lab provides services such as EDXRF, ICP‑MS, GC‑MS, and more. C‑MET also established a Centre of Excellence (CoE) in E‑Waste Management under a PPP model with MeitY and Telangana government, focusing on recycling technologies for PCBs, lithium‑ion batteries, permanent magnets, and solar cells. A 1 ton/day PCB recycling plant at Hyderabad has reached Technology Readiness Level 6 and is ready for commercialization.

== Centres and Infrastructure ==
C‑MET operates three main laboratories:

- Pune (Headquarters) – Focus areas include LTCC packaging, Li‑ion battery materials, specialty polymers, nanomaterials/composites.
- Hyderabad – Specializes in ultra‑pure materials, e‑waste processing, high‑purity metals, semiconductors, RoHS testing and electronics recycling technology.
- Thrissur – Focus on electronic ceramics, microwave dielectrics, actuators/sensors, nanofilms, aerogels and graphene supercapacitors.
