= Dixon Technologies =

Indian multinational electronics manufacturing services company pvt ltd

- Type: Public
- Traded as: NSE: DIXON; BSE: 540699
- ISIN: INE935N01012
- Industry: Electronics
- Founded: 1993; 33 years ago (as Weston Utilities Limited.)
- Founder: Sunil Vachani
- Headquarters: Noida, Uttar Pradesh, India
- Area served: Worldwide
- Key people: Sunil Vachani (executive chairman); Atul B Lall (managing director)
- Products: Consumer electronics; Home appliances; Lighting; Mobile phones; Security devices
- Services: Electronics manufacturing services; Original design manufacturing; Reverse logistics
- Revenue: ▲₹38,880 crore (US$4.2 billion) (FY25)
- Operating income: ▲₹1,528 crore (US$160 million) (FY24)
- Net income: ▲₹1,233 crore (US$130 million) (FY25)
- Number of employees: 2,844 permanent 12,757 including contractual (2023)
- Subsidiaries: Padget Electronics Private Limited; Dixtel Infocomm (74%)
- Website: www.dixoninfo.com

Dixon Technologies is an Indian multinational electronics manufacturing services company, based in Noida, Uttar Pradesh. It is a contract manufacturer of televisions, washing machines, smartphones, LED bulbs, battens, downlighters and CCTV security systems for companies such as Samsung, Xiaomi, Panasonic and Philips. It has 17 manufacturing units in India. The company is listed on BSE and NSE since its initial public offering in 2017.

== History ==
Dixon Technologies was founded in 1993 by Sunil Vachani. His father, Sundar Vachani had been manufacturing televisions under the Weston brand, which had launched the first colour television in India; his business struggled later on due to the emergence of other companies. Dixon initially manufactured 14-inch televisions, Sega video game consoles, Philips video recorders, and push-button phones for Bharti Airtel. A major breakthrough came in the 2000s when the company won a Government contract to manufacture televisions. Apart from televisions and video recorders, the company also started to manufacture air conditioners and microwave ovens for LG Electronics, as well as DVD players for other brands.

In 2018, Dixon signed a deal with Xiaomi to manufacture LED television sets at its Tirupati plant.

In January 2020, Dixon entered a partnership with Samsung for the local production of LED televisions.

In December 2024, Dixon Technologies and the Chinese mobile phone brand Vivo are forming a joint venture to manufacture electronic devices, including smartphones.

=== Padget Electronics ===
In December 2020, it was reported that Dixon's subsidiary Padget Electronics would manufacture smartphones for Motorola. In January 2021, Dixon announced that it would manufacture wireless speakers for the Indian company BoAt Lifestyle. Later that month, Padget Electronics signed a contract with HMD Global to manufacture Nokia smartphones at its Noida plant.

For the US and European markets, Padget Electronics will produce the base model of the Pixel smartphone in addition to other Google products. Full-scale manufacturing is scheduled to begin in September 2024.

== Operations ==
Dixon has 17 manufacturing units in India with over 15,000 employees. It has India's largest manufacturing plants for LED televisions (in Tirupati), washing machines (in Dehradun) and LED bulbs (in Noida). The company manufactures/assembles goods such as home appliances, smartphone, laptops, televisions, set top box, medical electronics, lights, security surveillance system.

== Joint ventures ==
The company has joint ventures with:

- BoAt Lifestyle
- Rexxam
- Bharti Airtel

== Customers ==
The following list consists of Dixon's present or past major customers

- Xiaomi
- Samsung
- Motorola
- BoAt Lifestyle
- Panasonic
- TCL Technology
- OnePlus
- Godrej
- Wipro Enterprises
- Havells
- Bajaj
- HMD Global (Nokia)
- Syska
- Philips
- LG Electronics
- Orient

== See also ==
- Cyient DLM
- Foxconn
- Wistron
- Make in India
