= Skill India =

Government of India initiative

- Country: India
- Prime Minister(s): Narendra Modi
- Ministry: Skill Development and Entrepreneurship
- Launched: 15 July 2015; 11 years ago
- Status: Active
- Website: www.skillindia.gov.in

Skill India or the National Skills Development Mission of India is a campaign launched by Prime Minister Narendra Modi. It is managed by the National Skills Development Corporation of India.

In 2025, Comptroller and Auditor General of India (CAG) found significant number of irregularities, ghost accounts, dubious certifications in the Skill India initiative.

== Mission ==
Skill India campaign was launched by Prime Minister Narendra Modi on 15 July 2015 to train over 30 crore people in India in different skills by 2022.

== Initiatives ==
Various initiatives under this campaign are:

- National Skill Development Mission
- National Policy for Skill Development and Entrepreneurship, 2015
- Pradhan Mantri Kaushal Vikas Yojana (PMKVY)
- Skill Loan scheme
- Rural India Skill

== Partnership concept ==
UK has entered into a partnership with India under the Skill India programme. Virtual partnerships will be initiated at the school level to enable young people of these country to experience the school system of the other country and develop an understanding of the culture, traditions and social and family systems. A commitment to achieve mutual recognition of UK and Indian qualifications was made.

== Skill India Developments ==
16 April 2022: India's first Skill India International Centre will be set up in Bhubaneswar for training youths with an aim to enhance overseas opportunities for the skilled workforce. A memorandum of understanding was exchanged between the National Skill Development Corporation (NSDC) and the Skill Development Institute (SDI) on Saturday in presence of Union Skill Development and Entrepreneurship Minister Dharmendra Pradhan.

The recent systematic literature review conducted by Cabral and Dhar (2019) has identified the significance of skill development wherein the implementation of such schemes mitigates poverty, utilizes the demographic dividend, socio-economic empowerment of underprivileged sectors, achieves economic growth, reduces social challenges, and improves economic inclusion. As far as institutional mechanisms are concerned, the National Skill Development Corporation (NSDC), the Ministry of Skill Development and Entrepreneurship, and the scheme Prime Minister Kaushal Vikas Yojana (PMKVY) have resulted in achieving considerable results, but not achieved the expected outcomes. The study argues the essential requirement of skill development to achieve technology adoption and women's empowerment in the country.

Oracle on 12 February 2016 announced that it will build a new 2.8 million sq. ft. campus in Bengaluru, which will be Oracle's largest outside of its headquarters in Redwood Shores, California. Oracle Academy will launch an initiative to train more than half-a-million students each year to develop computer science skills by expanding its partnerships to 2,700 institutions in India from 1,800 at present.

Japan's private sector is to set up six institutes of manufacturing to train 30,000 people over ten years in Japanese-style manufacturing skills and practices, primarily in the rural areas. Japan-India Institute of Manufacturing (JIM) and Japanese Endowed Courses (JEC) in engineering colleges designated by Japanese companies in India in cooperation between the public and private sectors would be established for this purpose. The first three institutes would be set up in Gujarat, Karnataka and Rajasthan in the summer of 2017.

In the budget of fiscal year 2017-18, the government of India has decided to set aside ₹ 17,000 crore, the highest ever allocation to this sector, in order to boost the Skill India Mission. At least ten million Indian youth enter the country's workforce each year, but the employment creation in India has not been able to absorb this influx, making increasing unemployment a severe problem. Through this allocation the government aims at generating employment and providing livelihood to the millions of young Indians who enter the workforce every year.

The government has invested ₹ 4000 crore in the launch of SANKALP (Skill Acquisition and Knowledge Awareness for Livelihood Promotion Programme), another big initiative under the Skill India Mission. Through this it aims at providing market relevant training to 350 million young Indians. Apart from this, the government would set up 100 India International Skills Centres that will conduct advanced courses in foreign languages to help youngsters prepare for overseas jobs.

== Performance ==
In 2025, the Comptroller and Auditor General of India (CAG) reported that the Skill India initiative, which had targeted training 500 million people by 2022, had trained only 13.2 million individuals, of whom 11 million had been certified. The CAG also identified significant irregularities, including ghost accounts and dubious certifications, and concluded that the reliability of the certification figures could not be assured.

== See also ==
- Digital India
- Make in India
- Economy of India
- National Skill Development Corporation
