= Semi-Conductor Laboratory =

Governmental research institute in India

- Industry: Semiconductors
- Founded: 1976; 49 years ago (as Semiconductor Complex Limited)
- Headquarters: Sahibzada Ajit Singh Nagar, Punjab
- Owner: Ministry of Electronics and Information Technology, Government of India
- Website: https://www.scl.gov.in/

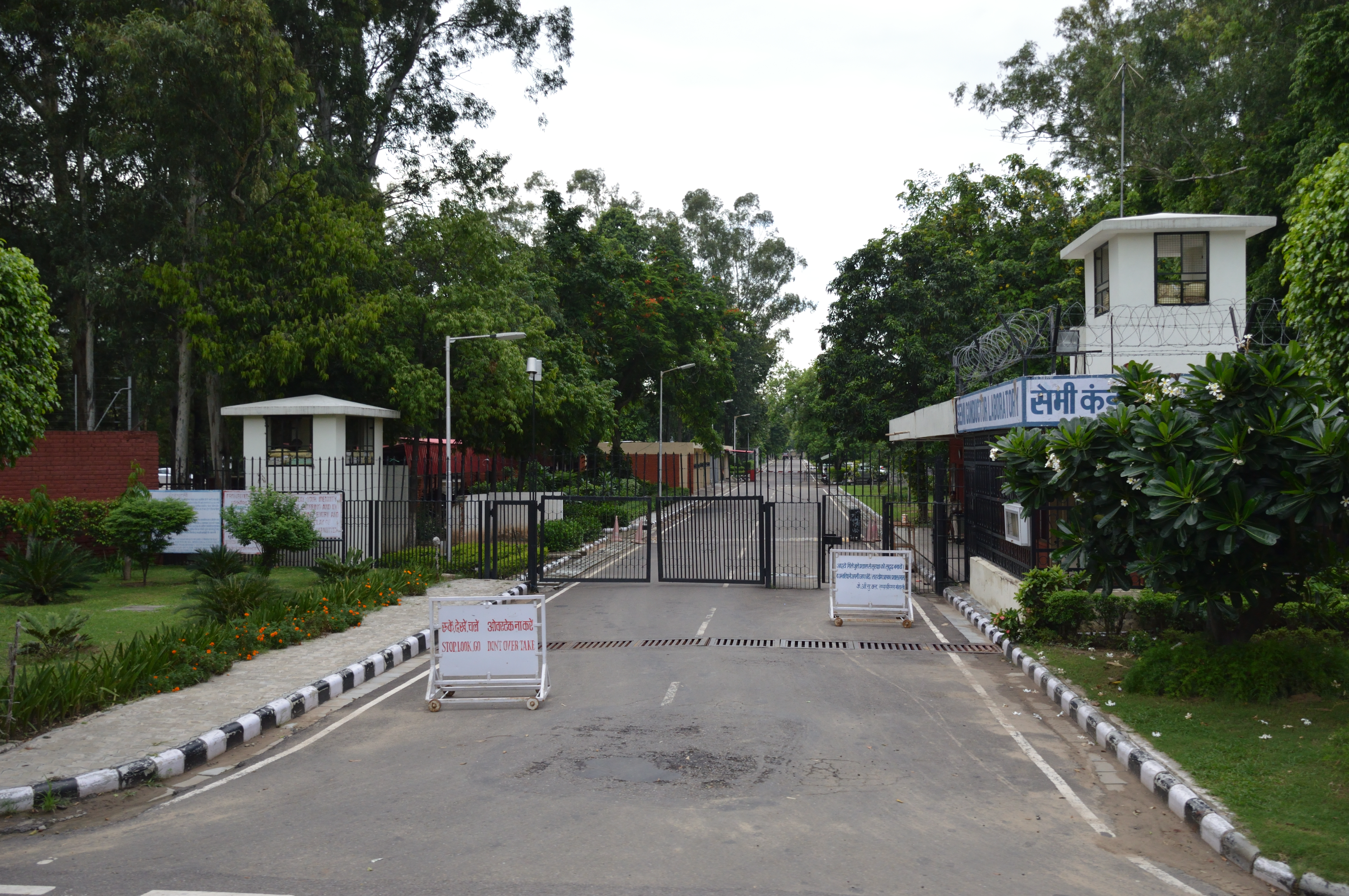
Semi-Conductor Laboratory entrance, sector 72, SAS Nagar.

The Semi-Conductor Laboratory (SCL), Mohali is a research institute under the Ministry of Electronics and Information Technology, Government of India. SCL was formerly under the Department of Space. SCL's aims include research and development (R&D) in the field of semiconductor technology. Semiconductors manufactured by SCL have been used in the Mars Orbiter Mission. The Indian Government is attempting to modernize SCL and upgrade its facilities.

== History ==
The Semi-Conductor Laboratory (SCL) is a public sector undertaking (PSU) of the Government of India, and was founded as the Semiconductor Complex Limited, in Mohali, Punjab. SCL was formed to develop India's ambitions for establishing a semiconductor manufacturing industry. In 1976, the Cabinet of India approved the formation of SCL, and the company began production in 1984. At first, Navi Mumbai was the leading contender for where SCL would be established, however, then Prime Minister Indira Gandhi eventually selected Mohali as the location for where SCL would be set up. Then Chief Minister of Punjab, Zail Singh offered 51-acres of land to SCL for a token one rupee cost. When SCL initially began production in 1984, the company had entered into a technical collaboration with American Microsystems and started the production of 5 micron complementary metal-oxide semiconductor (CMOS) technology.

In 1989, a fire broke out and destroyed SCL's facility in Mohali. The facility restarted production in 1997, however, the fire halted the growth of India's semiconductor industry. As of 2022, the cause of the fire is a mystery, including whether the fire was an accident or caused intentionally. SCL's revenues in 1999-2000 were about $14 million, with a profit of roughly $400,000.

SCL came under the administrative control of the Department of Space (DoS) in March 2005, and has since undergone organisational restructuring to become focused on research and development. The society was registered in November 2005. In 2006, Semiconductor Complex Limited was renamed to the Semi-Conductor Laboratory. As of 2023, SCL is under the administrative control of the Ministry of Electronics and Information Technology (MeitY).

== Facility and production ==
SCL is India's only integrated device manufacturing facility. Over 200 of types of CMOS devices can be made by SCL's wafer fabrication facilities.

SCL's chips have been used in Mangalyaan, India's Mars Orbiter Mission. Indian Institute of Technology Madras uses SCL as a primary foundry to tapeout SHAKTI processors using its 180 nm technology process. In 2021, SCL and the Indian Institute of Technology Bombay (IIT Bombay) invented India's first indigenous semiconductor memory technology. SCL and IIT Bombay demonstrating a CMOS-180nm-based 8-bit memory technology, that can also be adopted for production.

=== Bharat Semiconductor Research Centre ===
On October 20, 2023, the Ministry of Electronics and Information Technology stated that the Bharat Semiconductor Research Centre (BSRC) would be established starting in 2024, working with professionals from the industry and academic institutions. Rajeev Chandrashekhar states that BSRC will function as the Indian counterpart of the MIT Microelectronics Laboratory, Alan G. MacDiarmid NanoTech Institute, Industrial Technology Research Institute, and IMEC. The Bharat Semiconductor Research Centre will be located at IIT Madras. The center will be established initially as an institution co-located with Semi-Conductor Laboratory, with the potential to split off into a stand-alone semiconductor research organization in the future.

== Modernization efforts and fab upgrades ==
The Government of India is attempting to modernise SCL. In February 2023, the Indian government informed a Parliamentary Standing Committee that a joint venture with a commercial partner is being sought to modernise SCL's existing facility. In May 2023, the Indian government announced that it will invest $2 billion in SCL for the purposes of research and prototyping. The initial amount that Indian government was going to invest was approximately around $1.3 billion, however, the investment amount was later increased to $2 billion. MeitY also engaged Boston Consulting Group, a management consultancy company, to develop a long-term strategy for SCL.

In July 2023, Rajeev Chandrasekhar, the Minister of State For Electronics and Information Technology, stated that the Indian Government has approved the modernisation of SCL. SCL's modernisation will be a brownfield modernisation as a chip manufacturing unit.
