= Ministry of Electronics and Information Technology =

Government ministry of India

- Branch of Government of India

- Ministry of Electronics & Information Technology

Ministry overview
- Formed: 5 July 2016
- Preceding Ministry: Ministry of Communications and Information Technology
- Jurisdiction: Government of India
- Headquarters: Sanchar Bhawan New Delhi; 28°37′18″N 77°12′50″E
- Annual budget: ₹21,632.96 crore (US$2.2 billion) (2026-27 est.)
- Ministers responsible: Ashwini Vaishnaw, Cabinet Minister; Jitin Prasada, Minister of State
- Ministry executive: S. Krishnan IAS, Electronics and Information Technology Secretary
- Website: meity.gov.in एमईआईटीवाई.सरकार.भारत

The Ministry of Electronics and Information Technology (MEITy) is a ministry of the Government of India. It is responsible for formulating and implementing policies related to information technology, electronics, internet governance, digital services, and the promotion of the country's digital economy.

Under the sponsorship of the Ministry of Electronics and Information Technology, the "Northeast Heritage" Web, owned by the Government of India, publishes information on Northeast India, in 5 Indian languages, Assamese, Meitei (Manipuri), Bodo, Khasi and Mizo, in addition to Hindi and English.

== History ==
Previously known as the "Department of Information Technology", it was renamed as the Department of Electronics and Information Technology in 2012. On 19 July 2016, DeitY was made into full-fledged ministry, which henceforth is known as the Ministry of Electronics and Information Technology, bifurcating it from the Ministry of Communications and Information Technology.

== Organisation structure ==
The following is a list of child agencies subordinated within the "Ministry of Electronics and Information Technology, Union Government of the Republic of India".

To boost and leverage quantum computing potential, ministry has a partnership with Amazon Web Services (AWS). The initiative is said to boost researchers and scientists work on quantum computing and will provide access to Amazon's Braket cloud-based quantum computing service. The Ministry based on the proposal received and vetted by a steering committee will approve and sanction the set-up of the lab to bolster the quantum computing capability in India.

=== Child agencies ===
- National Informatics Centre (NIC)
- Standardisation Testing and Quality Certification (STQC) Directorate
- Controller of Certifying Authorities (CCA)
- Cyber Appellate Tribunal (CAT)
- Indian Computer Emergency Response Team (CERT-In)
- IN Registry

=== Companies under MeitY ===
- CSC e-Governance Services India Limited
- Digital India Corporation
- National Informatics Centre Services Incorporated (NICSI) — Public Sector Enterprise under control of National Informatics Centre.
- National Internet Exchange of India (NIXI)
- Unique Identification Authority of India (UIDAI)

=== Autonomous Societies of MeitY ===
- Education and Research Network of India (ERNET)
- Centre for Development of Advanced Computing (C-DAC)
- Centre for Materials for Electronics Technology (C-MET)
- National Institute of Electronics and Information Technology (NIELIT) — Formerly DOEACC Society
- Society for Applied Microwave Electronics Engineering & Research (SAMEER)
- Software Technology Parks of India (STPI)
- Electronics and Computer Software Export Promotion Council (ESC)
- Semi-Conductor Laboratory, Mohali (SCL)

== Cabinet Ministers ==
Portrait	Minister (Birth-Death) Constituency	Term of office			Political party	Ministry	Prime Minister
Portrait	Minister (Birth-Death) Constituency	From	To	Period	Political party	Ministry	Prime Minister
	Ravi Shankar Prasad (born 1954); Rajya Sabha MP for Bihar, until 2019; MP for Patna Sahib, from 2019	5 July 2016	7 July 2021	5 years, 2 days	Bharatiya Janata Party	Modi I	Narendra Modi
	Ravi Shankar Prasad (born 1954); Rajya Sabha MP for Bihar, until 2019; MP for Patna Sahib, from 2019	5 July 2016	7 July 2021	5 years, 2 days	Bharatiya Janata Party	Modi II	Narendra Modi
	Ashwini Vaishnaw (born 1970); Rajya Sabha MP for Odisha	7 July 2021	Incumbent	5 years, 78 days	Bharatiya Janata Party	Modi II	Narendra Modi
	Ashwini Vaishnaw (born 1970); Rajya Sabha MP for Odisha	7 July 2021	Incumbent	5 years, 78 days	Bharatiya Janata Party	Modi III	Narendra Modi

== Ministers of State ==
Portrait	Minister (Birth-Death) Constituency	Term of office			Political party	Ministry	Prime Minister
Portrait	Minister (Birth-Death) Constituency	From	To	Period	Political party	Ministry	Prime Minister
	P. P. Chaudhary (born 1953); MP for Pali	5 July 2016	3 September 2017	1 year, 60 days	Bharatiya Janata Party	Modi I	Narendra Modi
	Alphons Kannanthanam (born 1953); Rajya Sabha MP for Rajasthan	3 September 2017	14 May 2018	253 days	Bharatiya Janata Party	Modi I	Narendra Modi
	S. S. Ahluwalia (born 1951); MP for Darjeeling	14 May 2018	30 May 2019	1 year, 16 days	Bharatiya Janata Party	Modi I	Narendra Modi
	Sanjay Shamrao Dhotre (born 1959); MP for Akola	31 May 2019	7 July 2021	2 years, 37 days	Bharatiya Janata Party	Modi II	Narendra Modi
	Rajeev Chandrasekhar (born 1964); Rajya Sabha MP for Karnataka	7 July 2021	9 June 2024	2 years, 338 days	Bharatiya Janata Party	Modi II	Narendra Modi
	Jitin Prasada (born 1973); MP for Pilibhit	10 June 2024	Incumbent	2 years, 105 days	Bharatiya Janata Party	Modi III	Narendra Modi

== See also ==
- Ministry of Communications (India)
