= List of exports of India =

Exports of India by product category (2019) Chemical products Transportation Machines Mineral products Plastics and rubbers Metals Foodstuffs Precious metals Textiles Instruments Animal products Vegetable products Paper goods Footwear and headwear Miscellaneous Stone and glass Wood products Animal and vegetable bi-products Animal hides Arts and antiques Weapons

The following is a list of the exports of India. Export product categories that were exported the most and fetched foreign currency for India have been considered for the list. India is the world's 10th largest exporter, with a total export value (incl. goods and services) of $863.1 billion. The list includes the HS Codes and the value of the product exported. The data referenced in the system do not have any legal sanctity and is for general reference only.

For information on exports, see Export. For Harmonized Codes, see Harmonized System.

== List of exports 2024 ==
The following is the list of top 20 export product categories. Data is in millions of United States dollars for 2024, as reported by International Trade Centre.

Nr.	HSCode	Product	Value
1	27	Mineral fuels, mineral oils and products of their distillation; bituminous substances; mineral waxes	59,135.98
2	85	Electrical machinery	53,691.99
3	84	Nuclear reactors, boilers, machinery and mechanical appliances; parts thereof	36,206.49
4	71	Natural or cultured pearls, precious or semi-precious stones, precious metals, metals clad with precious metal, and articles thereof; imitation jewellery; coin	29,734.12
5	30	Pharmaceutical products	25,822.21
6	87	Vehicles other than railway or tramway rolling stock, and parts and accessories thereof	25,162.72
7	29	Organic chemicals	20,167.52
8	10	Cereals	12,414.8
9	73	Articles of iron or steel	10,562.89
10	72	Iron and steel	9,915.72
11	62	Articles of apparel and clothing accessories, not knitted or crocheted	8,384.35
12	39	Plastics and articles thereof	7,901.46
13	61	Articles of apparel and clothing accessories, knitted or crocheted	7,895.53
14	38	Miscellaneous chemical products	7,205.54
15	03	Fish and crustaceans, molluscs and other aquatic invertebrates	6,995.38
16	76	Aluminium and articles thereof	6,797.66
17	63	Other made-up textile articles; sets; worn clothing and worn textile articles; rags	6,106.19
18	52	Cotton	6,104.33
19	90	Optical, photographic, cinematographic, measuring, checking, precision, medical or surgical instruments and apparatus; parts and accessories thereof	5,644.31
20	09	Coffee, tea, maté and spices	5,600.22

== List of exports 2022 ==
The following is the list of top 20 export product categories. Data is in millions of United States dollars for 2022, as reported by International Trade Centre.

Nr.	HSCode	Product	Value
1.	27	Mineral fuels, mineral oils and products of their distillation; bituminous substances; mineral waxes	98,472.28
2.	71	Natural or cultured pearls, precious or semi-precious stones, precious metals, metals clad with precious metal, and articles thereof; imitation jewellery; coin	39,274.61
3.	84	Nuclear reactors, boilers, machinery and mechanical appliances; parts thereof	27,502.75
4.	85	Electrical machinery	26,573.97
5.	29	Organic chemicals	21,876.53
6.	87	Vehicles	21,256.87
7.	30	Pharmaceutical products	19,799.95
8.	72	Iron and steel	15,198.28
9.	10	Cereals	14,087.76
10.	73	Iron or steel articles	9,898.01
11.	76	Aluminium and articles thereof	9,597.94
12.	62	Articles of apparel and clothing accessories, not knitted or crocheted	8,473.39
13.	39	Plastics and articles thereof	8,235.83
14.	61	Knit apparel	8,203.85
15.	38	Miscellaneous chemical products	8,068.06
16.	52	Cotton	6,942.55
17.	03	Seafood	6,771.67
18.	17	Sugar and Confectionery	6,327.11
19.	63	Clothing	6,020.98
20.	40	Rubber	4,826.75

== List of exports 2017 ==
The following is the list of top 20 export product categories. Data is in millions of United States dollars for 2017, as reported by Department of Commerce, Government of India.

Sr. No.	HSCode	Product	Value
1.	71	Mineral fuels	43,623.16
2.	27	Refined petroleum	32,435.65
3.	87	Automobiles	14,950.08
4.	84	Machinery and mechanical appliances	14,100.58
5.	29	Organic chemicals	11,688.52
6.	30	Pharmaceutical products	12,930.48
7.	72	Iron and steel	8,682.99
8.	62	Textiles	9,164.61
9.	61	Knit apparel and accessories	8,223.74
10.	85	Electrical machinery	8,232.02
11.	10	Cereal	6,012.95
12.	03	Seafood	5,501.05
13.	73	Iron and Steel articles	5,916.09
14.	52	Cotton.	6,611.05
15.	39	Plastics	5,294.11
16.	89	Ships and marine equipment	4,524.25
17.	63	Clothing	4,705.34
18.	76	Aluminium	3,223.05
19.	02	Meat.	5000.61
20.	38	Miscellaneous Chemical products.	3,249.08

== List of exports 2016 ==
The following is the list of top twenty export product categories. Data is for 2016, in millions of United States dollars, as reported by Department of Commerce, Government of India.

#	HSCode	Product	Value
1.	71	NATURAL OR CULTURED PearlS, PRECIOUS OR SEMIPRECIOUS STONES, PRE.METALS, CLAD WITH PRE.METAL AND ARTICLES THEREOF; IMIT.JEWELRY; Coin.	39,553.18
2.	27	Mineral fuels, Mineral oilS AND PRODUCTS OF THEIR DISTILLATION; BITUMINOUS SUBSTANCES; MINERAL WAXES.	31,231.53
3.	87	VEHICLES OTHER THAN RAILWAY OR TRAMWAY ROLLING STOCK, AND PARTS AND ACCESSORIES THEREOF.	14,355.90
4.	84	Nuclear reactorS, BoilerS, MACHINERY AND MECHANICAL APPLIANCES; PARTS THEREOF.	13,246.86
5.	30	PHARMACEUTICAL PRODUCTS	12,910.04
6.	29	Organic chemicals	11,509.31
7.	62	ARTICLES OF APPAREL AND CLOTHING ACCESSORIES, NOT KNITTED OR CrochetED.	9,324.44
8.	72	Iron AND Steel	5,492.73
9.	85	ELECTRICAL MACHINERY AND EQUIPMENT AND PARTS THEREOF; Sound recorders AND REPRODUCERS, TELEVISION IMAGE AND SOUND RECORDERS AND REPRODUCERS, AND PARTS.	7,998.31
10.	61	ARTICLES OF Apparel AND Clothing ACCESSORIES, KNITTED OR CORCHETED.	7,665.08
11.	52	Cotton.	7,313.22
12.	10	CerealS.	6,272.02
13.	73	ARTICLES OF Iron OR Steel	6,155.98
14.	03	Fish AND CrustaceanS, MOLLUSCS AND OTHER AQUATIC INVERTABRATES.	4,486.28
15.	39	Plastic AND ARTICLES THEREOF.	5,242.44
16.	63	OTHER MADE UP Textile ARTICLES; SETS; WORN CLOTHING AND WORN TEXTILE ARTICLES; RAGS	4,586.46
17.	89	ShipS, BoatS AND FLOATING STRUCTURES.	3,088.51
18.	02	Meat AND EDIBLE MEAT OFFAL.	4,209.98
19.	88	Aircraft, Spacecraft, AND PARTS THEREOF.	3,729.57
20.	38	MISCELLANEOUS Chemical products.	3,061.19

== List of exports 2015 ==
The following is the list of top twenty export product categories. Data is for 2015, in millions of United States dollars, as reported by Department of Commerce, Government of India.

#	HSCode	Product	Value
1.	71	NATURAL OR CULTURED PearlS, PRECIOUS OR Semiprecious STONES, PRE.METALS, CLAD WITH PRE.METAL AND ARTICLES THEREOF;IMIT.JEWLRY;COIN.	41,549.72
2.	27	Mineral fuels, Mineral oilS AND PRODUCTS OF THEIR DISTILLATION; BITUMINOUS SUBSTANCES; MINERAL WAXES.	57,620.04
3.	87	VEHICLES OTHER THAN RAILWAY OR TRAMWAY ROLLING STOCK, AND PARTS AND ACCESSORIES THEREOF.	14,473.84
4.	84	Nuclear reactorS, BoilerS, MACHINERY AND MECHANICAL APPLIANCES; PARTS THEREOF.	13,802.85
5.	30	PHARMACEUTICAL PRODUCTS	11,584.58
6.	29	Organic chemicals	11,948.91
7.	62	ARTICLES OF APPAREL AND CLOTHING ACCESSORIES, NOT KNITTED OR CrochetED.	9,192.14
8.	85	ELECTRICAL MACHINERY AND EQUIPMENT AND PARTS THEREOF; Sound recorders AND REPRODUCERS, TELEVISION IMAGE AND SOUND RECORDERS AND REPRODUCERS, AND PARTS.	8,696.79
9.	61	ARTICLES OF APPAREL AND CLOTHING ACCESSORIES, KNITTED OR CORCHETED.	7,654.62
10.	52	Cotton.	7,717.95
11.	10	CerealS.	9,550.98
12.	73	ARTICLES OF IRON OR Steel	7,592.08
13.	72	IRON AND Steel	8,684.38
14.	39	Plastic AND ARTICLES THEREOF.	5,081.47
15.	63	OTHER MADE UP Textile ARTICLES; SETS; WORN CLOTHING AND WORN TEXTILE ARTICLES; RAGS	4,645.64
16.	03	Fish AND CrustaceanS, MOLLUSCS AND OTHER AQUATIC INVERTABRATES.	5,249.51
17.	02	Meat AND EDIBLE MEAT OFFAL.	4,929.27
18.	88	AIRCRAFT, Spacecraft, AND PARTS THEREOF.	6,159.63
19.	89	SHIPS, BoatS AND FLOATING STRUCTURES.	5,352.61
20.	38	MISCELLANEOUS Chemical products.	3,177.26

== List of exports 2014 ==
The following is the list of top twenty export product categories. Data is for 2014, in millions of United States dollars, as reported by Department of Commerce, Government of India.

#	HSCode	Product	Value
1	27	Mineral fuels, Mineral oilS AND PRODUCTS OF THEIR DISTILLATION; BITUMINOUS SUBSTANCES; MINERAL WAXES.	64,685.32
2.	71	NATURAL OR CULTURED PearlS, PRECIOUS OR SEMIPRECIOUS STONES, PRE.METALS, CLAD WITH PRE.METAL AND ARTCLS THEREOF;IMIT.JEWLRY;COIN.	41,692.25
3.	87	VEHICLES OTHER THAN RAILWAY OR TRAMWAY ROLLING STOCK, AND PARTS AND ACCESSORIES THEREOF.	12,933.03
4.	84	Nuclear reactorS, BoilerS, MACHINERY AND MECHANICAL APPLIANCES; PARTS THEREOF.	12,077.17
5.	29	Organic chemicals	12,017.17
6.	30	Pharmaceutical products	11,140.50
7.	10	CerealS.	10,562.89
8.	62	ARTICLES OF APPAREL AND Clothing ACCESSORIES, NOT Knitted OR CROCHETED.	8,343.35
9.	85	ELECTRICAL MACHINERY AND EQUIPMENT AND PARTS THEREOF; SOUND RECORDERS AND REPRODUCERS, TELEVISION IMAGE AND SOUND RECORDERS AND REPRODUCERS, AND PARTS.	10,298.51
10.	72	Iron AND Steel	9,223.38
11.	52	Cotton.	9,926.42
12.	61	ARTICLES OF APPAREL AND CLOTHING ACCESSORIES, KNITTED OR CORCHETED.	6,657.53
13.	73	ARTICLES OF Iron OR Steel	6,807.49
14.	88	Aircraft, Spacecraft, AND PARTS THEREOF.	4,585.27
15.	89	ShipS, BoatS AND FLOATING STRUCTURES.	3,724.76
16.	03	Fish AND CrustaceanS, Mollusca AND OTHER AQUATIC INVERTABRATES.	4,823.02
17.	39	Plastic AND ARTICLES THEREOF.	5,633.51
18.	02	Meat AND EDIBLE MEAT OFFAL.	4,475.53
19.	63	OTHER MADE UP Textile ARTICLES; SETS; WORN CLOTHING AND WORN TEXTILE ARTICLES; RAGS	4,457.30
20.	74	Copper AND ARTICLES THEREOF.	2,783.56

== List of exports 2013 ==
The following is the list of top twenty export product categories. Data is for 2013, in millions of United States dollars, as reported by Department of Commerce, Government of India.

#	HSCode	Product	Value
1.	27	Mineral fuels, Mineral oilS AND PRODUCTS OF THEIR DISTILLATION; BITUMINOUS SUBSTANCES; MINERAL WAXES.	62,105.50
2.	71	NATURAL OR CULTURED PearlS, PRECIOUS OR SEMIPRECIOUS STONES, PRE.METALS, CLAD WITH PRE.METAL AND ARTICLES THEREOF; IMIT.JEWELRY; COIN.	43,768.38
3.	87	VEHICLES OTHER THAN RAILWAY OR TRAMWAY ROLLING STOCK, AND PARTS AND ACCESSORIES THEREOF.	12,193.34
4.	84	Nuclear reactorS, BoilerS, MACHINERY AND MECHANICAL APPLIANCES; PARTS THEREOF.	11,549.63
5.	29	Organic chemicals	12,107.26
6.	30	Pharmaceutical products	10,062.70
7.	10	CerealS.	9,655.41
8.	85	ELECTRICAL MACHINERY AND EQUIPMENT AND PARTS THEREOF; SOUND RECORDERS AND REPRODUCERS, TELEVISION IMAGE AND SOUND RECORDERS AND REPRODUCERS, AND PARTS.	10,862.71
9.	52	Cotton.	8,937.03
10.	72	Iron AND Steel	8,089.44
11.	62	ARTICLES OF Apparel AND CLOTHING ACCESSORIES, NOT Knitted OR CrochetED.	7,407.96
12.	73	ARTICLES OF Iron OR Steel	7,436.27
13.	61	ARTICLES OF APPAREL AND CLOTHING ACCESSORIES, Knitted OR CORCHETED.	5,554.24
14.	39	Plastic AND ARTICLES THEREOF.	5,150.11
15.	03	Fish AND CrustaceanS, Mollusca AND OTHER AQUATIC INVERTABRATES.	3,322.71
16.	88	Aircraft, SPACECRAFT, AND PARTS THEREOF.	2,210.24
17.	02	Meat AND EDIBLE MEAT OFFAL.	3,286.87
18.	63	OTHER MADE UP Textile ARTICLES; SETS; WORN CLOTHING AND WORN TEXTILE ARTICLES; RAGS	4,039.08
19.	89	ShipS, BoatS AND FLOATING STRUCTURES.	3,838.27
20.	99	MISCELLANEOUS Goods.	4,438.24

== List of exports 2012 ==
The following is a list of the exports of India. Data is for 2012, in millions of United States dollars, as reported by The Observatory of Economic Complexity. Currently the top twenty exports are listed.

#	Product	Value
1	Refined petroleum	52,905
2	Jewellery	17,814
3	Pharmaceuticals	10,886
4	Rice	6,109
5	Cars	4,828
6	Vegetable Saps	4,430
7	Raw Cotton	3,857
8	Broadcasting Equipment	3,482
9	Iron ore	3,212
10	Non-Retail Pure Cotton Yarn	3,211
11	Car parts	2,870
12	Frozen Beef	2,746
13	Nitrogen Heterocyclic Compounds	2,710
14	Non-Knit Women's Suits	2,476
15	Diamonds	2,411
16	Cyclic Hydrocarbons	2,292
17	Refined Copper	2,248
18	Raw sugar	2,104
19	Soybean meal	2,035
20	House Linens	1,999

== See also ==
- Economy of India
- Foreign relations of India
- Remittances to India
- Business process outsourcing to India
- List of Indian states and union territories by exports
- List of largest trading partners of India
- Indian diaspora
- Indianisation
- Directorate General of Foreign Trade (DGFT)
- Merchandise Export from India Scheme
- Make in India
- India Inc.
- Medical tourism in India
- Electronics and semiconductor manufacturing industry in India
