= Hundi =

Indian financial instrument

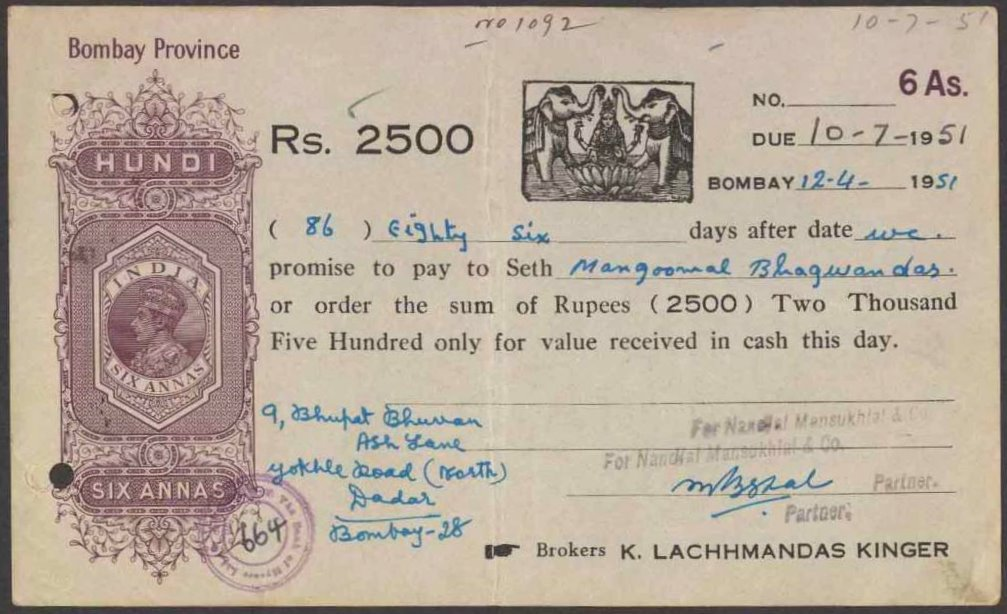
A hundi for ₹2500 of 1951, stamped in the Bombay State with a pre-printed revenue stamp.

A hundi or hundee (Hindi: हुण्डी, romanized: Huṇḍī, Sanskrit: हुण्डिका, romanized: Huṇḍikā, lit. 'bill of exchange, draft, or promissory note') is a financial instrument that was developed in Medieval India for use in trade and credit transactions. Hundis are used as a form of remittance instrument to transfer money from place to place, as a form of credit instrument or IOU to borrow money and as a bill of exchange in trade transactions. The Reserve Bank of India describes the hundi as "an unconditional order in writing made by a person directing another to pay a certain sum of money to a person named in the order."

== History ==
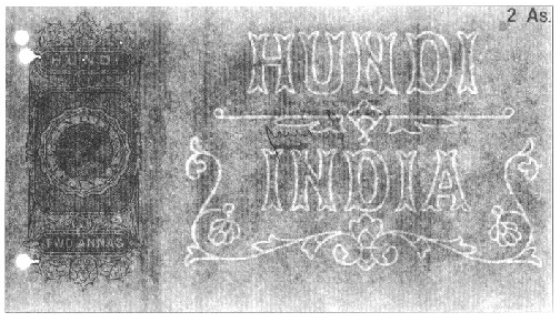
Government issued hundis included a watermark to prevent forgery.

Hundis have a very long history in India. Written records show their use at least as far back as the Twelfth century. The merchant Banarasi Das belonging to the Digambara Jain Sect, born in 1586, received a hundi for 200 rupees from his father to enable him to borrow money to start trading.

During the colonial era, the British Empire regarded the hundi system as indigenous or traditional, but not informal. They were reluctant to interfere with it as it formed such an important part of the Indian economy and they also wished to tax the transactions taking place within the system. Official hundi forms were produced incorporating revenue stamps bearing the image of British monarchs, including Queen Victoria, and disputes between merchants often entered the court system, so in no way was the system an underground one even though it did not take place through normal banking channels.

== Types of hundi ==
- Sahyog Hundi: This is drawn by one merchant on another, asking the latter to pay the amount to a third merchant. In this case the merchant on whom the hundi is drawn is of some 'credit worthiness' in the market and is known in the bazaar. A sahyog hundi passes from one hand to another until it reaches the final recipient, who, after reasonable enquiries, presents it to the drawee for acceptance of the payment. Sahyog means co-operation in Hindi and Gujrati, the predominant languages of traders. The hundi is so named because it required the cooperation of multiple parties to ensure that the hundi has an acceptable risk and a fairly good likelihood of being paid, in the absence of a formalized credit monitoring and reporting framework.
- Darshani Hundi: This is a hundi payable on sight. It must be presented for payment within a reasonable time after its receipt by the holder. Thus, it is similar to a demand bill.
- Muddati Hundi: A muddati or miadi hundi is payable after a specified period of time. This is similar to a time bill.

There are few other varieties; the Nam-jog hundi, Dhani-jog hundi, Jawabee hundi, Jokhami hundi, Firman-jog hundi, etc.

- Nam-jog hundi - such a hundi is payable only to the person whose name is mentioned on the Hundi. Such a hundi cannot be endorsed in favour of any other person and is akin to a bill on which a restrictive endorsement has been made.
- Furman-jog Hundi - such a hundi can be paid either to the person whose name is mentioned in the hundi or to any person so ordered by him. Such a hundi is similar to a cheque payable on order and no endorsement is required on such a hundi.
- Dhani-jog Hundi - when the hundi is payable to the holder or bearer, it is known as a dhani jog hundi. It is similar to an instrument payable to bearer.
- Jokhim-Hundi - normally a hundi is unconditional but a jokhim hundi is conditional in the sense that the drawer promises to pay the amount of the hundi only on the satisfaction of a certain condition. Such a hundi is not negotiable, and the prevalence of such hundis is very rare these days because banks and insurance companies refuse to accept such hundis.
- Jawabi Hundi - if money is transferred from one place to another through the hundi and the person receiving the payment on is to give an acknowledgement (jawab) for same, then such a hundi is known as a Jawabi Hundi.
- Khaka Hundi - a hundi which has already been paid is known as a Khaka Hundi.
- Khoti Hundi - In case there is any kind of defect in the hundi or in case the hundi has been forged, then such a hundi is known as a khoti hundi.

== See also ==
Remittance

- Global ranking of remittance by nations
- Remittances to India
- Hawala
- Informal value transfer system
- Financial Action Task Force

Indian economy

- Economy of India
- Economic history of India
- Business process outsourcing to India
- Foreign trade of India
- List of exports of India
- List of the largest trading partners of India

Factors influencing remittances to India

- Indian diaspora
- Greater India
- Indosphere

Others

- Negotiable Instruments Act, 1881
- Correspondent account
