= Made in India =

Made in India may refer to:

- Make in India, Indian government initiative to encourage domestic manufacturing
- "Made in India", an Indian government campaign under Brand India
- Made in India (album), a 1995 album and its title song by Alisha Chinai
- BBC World's "Made in India" segments, including Mastermind India between 1998 and 2002
- Made in India (1996 TV series), an Indian music programme on Channel V
- Made in India (2014 TV series), an Indian Hindi-language TV series about Indian inventions, aired on Epic TV
- "Made in India", a 2018 song by Guru Randhawa
- Khatron Ke Khiladi: Made in India, an Indian reality TV series

== See also ==
- India Inc., term for the formal sector in India
- Category:Industry in India
