= Remittances to India =

Payments to Indian residents from a foreign country

Remittances to India are money transfers from non-resident Indians (NRIs) employed outside the country to family, friends, or relatives residing in India. India is the world's top receiver of remittances, claiming more than 12% of the world's remittances in 2015. Remittances to India stood at US$125 billion in 2023, up from US$69 billion in 2017. Remittances from India to other countries totalled US$5.710 billion in 2017, for a net inflow of US$63.258 billion in 2017.

As per the Ministry of Overseas Indian Affairs (MOIA), remittance is received from the approximately 35 million members of the Indian diaspora. Remittances to India have long been a cornerstone of the nation's economy, significantly contributing to household incomes, economic stability, and overall development. These financial transfers from non-resident Indians (NRIs) are vital not only for the families receiving them but also for the broader economic landscape of the country. As one of the largest recipients of remittances globally, India benefits immensely from the steady flow of funds sent by its vast diaspora.

== History ==
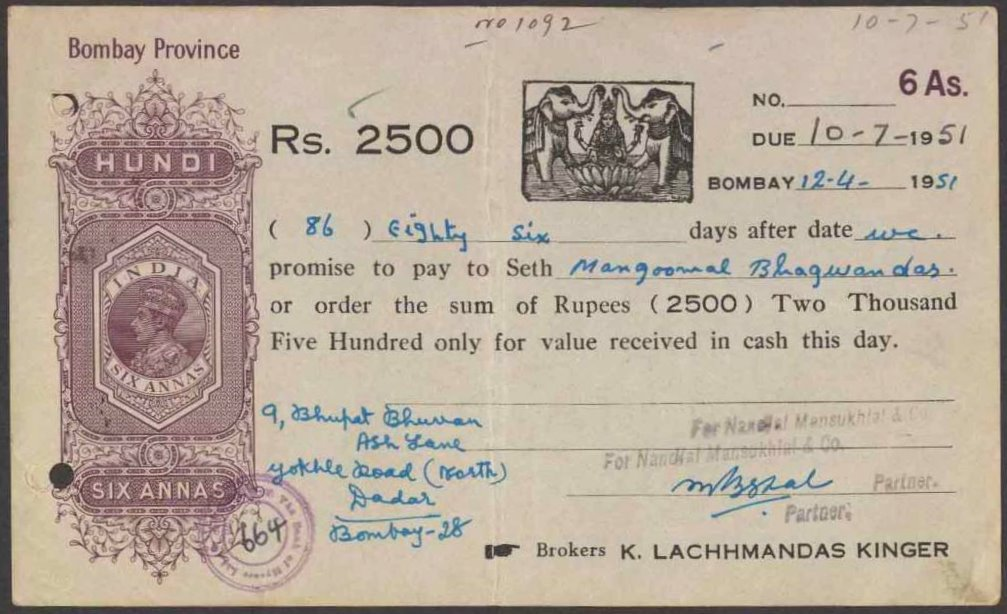
Medieval Hundi is Indian-origin remittance system. A hundi for Rs 2500 of 1951 stamped in the Bombay Province with a pre-printed revenue stamp.

== Overview ==
Remittances to India have a rich historical backdrop dating back to the colonial era when Indian laborers were transported to various British colonies. Over 1.5 million Indians were laborers transported to multiple British colonies between 1834 and 1917. This migration, predominantly to regions like the Caribbean and Southeast Asia, served the economic interests of the British Empire while significantly impacting the socio-economic landscape of India. The remittances sent back by these migrant workers played a crucial role in supporting families left behind, contributing to local economies, and fostering economic ties between regions.

Post-independence, the patterns of Indian migration and remittances shifted, influenced by global economic dynamics. During the latter half of the 20th century, Indians increasingly moved to countries in the Middle East, North America, and Europe in search of better employment opportunities. During the 1990s, India experienced a significant increase in remittance inflows. According to World Bank data, remittances to India rose from approximately $2 billion in 1990 to $82.2 billion in 2019, reflecting a remarkable growth trajectory. This migration wave saw a corresponding increase in remittance flows, which continued to grow through the 21st century despite global economic fluctuations.

From 2001 to 2010, India experienced a substantial increase in remittance inflows, rising from approximately $12 billion at the start of the decade to about $55 billion by its conclusion, according to World Bank data. From 2011 to 2020, remittances continued to grow in the subsequent decade, albeit with fluctuations influenced by global economic conditions. Starting at $58 billion in 2011, remittances peaked at around $83 billion in 2020, demonstrating resilience despite challenges such as the 2008 financial crisis and geopolitical shifts.

Under the Foreign Exchange Management Act (FEMA) of 1999, N Indians (NRIs) and Persons of Indian Origin (PIOs) can open and maintain three types of accounts namely, Non-Resident Ordinary Rupee Account (NRO Account), Non-Resident (External) Rupee Account (NRE Account) and Foreign Currency Non Resident (Bank) Account – FCNR (B) Account. NRO Accounts are not repatriable except for all current income. Balances in an NRO account of NRIs/ PIOs are remittable up to US$1 (one) million per financial year (April–March) along with their other eligible assets. NRE Accounts are repatriable. Credits permitted to NRE account are inward remittance from outside India, interest accruing on the account, interest on investment, transfer from other NRE/ FCNR(B) accounts, maturity proceeds of investments (if such investments were made from this account or through inward remittance). Inward remittances from outside India, legitimate dues in India and transfers from other NRO accounts are permissible credits to NRO account.

Since 1991, India has experienced sharp remittance growth. In 1991 Indian remittances were valued at US$2.1 billion; in 2006, they were estimated at between $22 billion and $25.7 billion. which grew to $67.6 billion in 2012–13, up from $66.1 billion the fiscal year, 2011–2012, when the remittance exceed the foreign direct investment (FDI) inflow of $46.84 billion into India.

Money is sent to India either electronically (for example, by SWIFT) or by demand draft. In recent years many banks are offering money transfers and this has grown into a huge business.

In recent years many Indian Immigrants have used online money transfer services to send money from overseas to India. In recent years, many new Online and mobile companies have facilitated the transition to online remittances. Even some Indian banks have recently offered such services.

A 2012 study, by Reserve Bank of India revealed 30.8% of total foreign remittances was from West Asia, compared to 29.4% from North America and 19.5% from Europe.

However, owing to the onslaught of COVID-19, the World Bank has estimated a 9% decline in the remittances to India.

According to international media reports, escalating military and political tensions in the Persian Gulf region involving Israel-US war on Iran, as well as allied regional states, have contributed to economic and labor market disruptions. The Gulf Cooperation Council (GCC) countries host millions of migrant workers, including approximately 9 million Indian nationals, who collectively send tens of billions of dollars in annual remittances. The reports note that heightened regional instability and security concerns have affected employment conditions, contract renewals, and workforce mobility, leading to the return of a number of migrant workers to India, particularly impacting regions such as Kerala.

== Remittances to India by fiscal year ==
The following table illustrates the remittances to India as percent of GDP.

Remittance by fiscal year
Year	Remittances	Percent GDP
1990–1991	US$2.10 bn	0.70%
1995–1996	US$8.50 bn	3.22%
1999–2000	US$12.07 bn	2.72%
2000–2001	US$12.85 bn	2.84%
2001–2002	US$15.40 bn	3.29%
2002–2003	US$16.39 bn	3.39%
2003–2004	US$21.61 bn	3.69%
2004–2005	US$20.25 bn	3.03%
2005–2006	US$24.55 bn	3.08%
2006–2007	US$29.10 bn	2.39%
2007–2008	US$37.20 bn	2.77%
2008–2009	US$51.60 bn	3.84%
2009–2010	US$55.06 bn	3.28%
2011–2012	US$66.10 bn	3.61%
2012–2013	US$67.60 bn	3.64%
2013–2014	US$70.39 bn	3.45%
2014–2015	US$66.30 bn	3.15%
2015–2016	US$62.70 bn	2.73%
2016–2017	US$65.30 bn	2.46%
2017–2018	US$80.00 bn	2.95%
2018–2019	US$79.00 bn	2.78%
2019–2020	US$83.30 bn	3.12%
2020–2021	US$87.00 bn	2.75%
2021–2022	US$89.00 bn	3.00%
2022–2023	US$110 bn	3.30%
2023–2024	US$129 bn	3.40%

== Remittances to and from India by country ==
According to the former RBI Governor Shaktikanta Das total of US$107.5 billion (2022–23) was made in remittances to India from other countries. Whereas total of US$7.01 billion (2020) was made in remittances to other countries from India. The following tables list the top ten source countries for remittances to India and the top ten destination countries for remittances from India in 2017. Somewhat different figures have been estimated by the Reserve Bank of India.

India's status as a leading recipient of remittances is driven by its extensive network of expatriates spread across the globe, who send money home through various channels, including traditional banks, ACH or wire transfers, and digital providers. India's status has emerged as one of the largest recipients of remittances globally. In 2021, remittances surged to approximately $105.6 billion, reflecting ongoing support from overseas Indian communities amidst global economic uncertainties. By 2022, remittances surged to the highest value of $111+ billion, affirming India's position as a top destination for financial transfers worldwide. In 2023, India received an estimated $125 billion in remittances, marking a significant increase and highlighting the continued importance of these financial inflows to the Indian economy.

The primary sources of remittances to India include the United States, the United Arab Emirates, Saudi Arabia, and the United Kingdom. These countries host large Indian communities that regularly send home money to support their families and invest in various sectors. The diversity in the sources of remittances ensures a stable and continuous flow of funds, even when specific regions face economic challenges.

=== Inward remittances by source country ===
According to RBI, the top source countries for remittance to India in 2023-24 are as follows.

Source Country-wise Share in India's Inward Remittances (Banks)
Source country	2016–17 (%)	2020–21 (%)	2023–24 (%)
United States	22.9	23.4	27.7
United Arab Emirates	26.9	18.0	19.2
United Kingdom	3.0	6.8	10.8
Saudi Arabia	11.6	5.1	6.7
Singapore	5.5	2.4	6.6
Kuwait	6.5	1.5	3.9
Qatar	–	5.7	4.1
Canada	3.0	1.6	3.8
Oman	1.0	0.6	2.5
Australia	–	–	2.3
Bahrain	0.7	0.7	1.5
Hong Kong	–	–	1.3
Germany	0.6	0.6	1.0
Belgium	0.9	1.1	0.4
Malaysia	–	–	0.6
New Zealand	2.3	0.7	0.5
Ireland	–	–	0.4
Netherlands	–	–	0.5
Japan	–	–	0.3
Switzerland	–	–	0.4
France	0.1	0.1	0.2
Italy	–	–	0.1
Indonesia	–	–	0.2
Thailand	–	–	0.2
South Africa	–	–	0.1
Spain	–	–	0.1
Others	14.8	31.6	4.4
Note: For 2023-24, shares are derived based on two major components of inward remittances – (a) transfers for family maintenance and savings; (b) local withdrawals from non-resident deposit accounts. Source: Data for 2016–17 and 2020–21 are sourced from the RBIs remittance surveys – RBI (2018) and RBI (2022a), respectively.

== See also ==
Remittance related

- Global ranking of remittance by nations
- Hawala
- Hundi

Indian economy related

- Economy of India
- Business process outsourcing to India
- Foreign trade of India
- List of exports of India
- Largest trading partners of India

Factors influencing remittances to India

- Indian diaspora
- Global ranking of remittance by nations
- Indosphere

Others

- Negotiable Instruments Act, 1881
- Correspondent account
