= Sonali Gulati =

Indian independent filmmaker

- Born: New Delhi, India
- Occupation: Film director
- Awards: Guggenheim Fellowship, Creative Capital Foundation Award
- Website: https://www.sonalifilm.com/

Sonali Gulati is an Indian American independent filmmaker, feminist, grass-roots activist, and educator.

Gulati grew up in New Delhi, India. Her mother, a teacher and textile designer, raised her independently, She has made several films that have screened at over five hundred film festivals worldwide. Her films have screened at venues such as the Hirshhorn Museum, the Museum of Fine Arts in Boston, the National Museum of Women in the Arts, and at film festivals such as the Margaret Mead Film Festival, the Black Maria Film Festival, Slamdance Film Festival, and BlackStar Film Festival.

Gulati he has an MFA in Film & Media Arts from Temple University and a BA in Critical Social Thought from Mount Holyoke College. She is currently a professor at Virginia Commonwealth University's Department of Photography & Film.

== Film ==
Sonali Gulati has made several short films and a feature-length documentary film.

Gulati's award-winning 2005 documentary film, Nalini by Day, Nancy by Night explores business process outsourcing in India. The film was broadcast on public television in the U.S., Canada, Europe, Australia, New Zealand, The Middle East, South Asia and North Africa.

Her film I AM has won 14 awards and continues to exhibit extensively. Gulati's award-winning documentary film I Am was broadcast on public television and cable TV in the U.S. and Portugal. Her documentary film Nalini by Day, Nancy by Night, was broadcast on television in the U.S., Canada, Europe, Australia, New Zealand, South Asia, and North Africa.

== Awards ==
Gulati is a Guggenheim Fellow in Film. She has won awards, grants, and fellowships from the Third Wave Foundation, World Studio Foundation, the Robert Giard Memorial Fellowship, the Virginia Museum of Fine Arts Fellowship, the Theresa Pollak Prize for Excellence in the Arts, the Center for Asian American Media (CAAM), VCU School of the Arts Faculty Award of Excellence, grants from Creative Capital and was a Guggenheim Fellow in Film/Video in 2013.

Gulati is a Guggenheim Fellow in Film. She has won awards, grants, and fellowships from the Third Wave Foundation, World Studio Foundation, the Robert Giard Memorial Fellowship, the Virginia Museum of Fine Arts Fellowship, the Theresa Pollak Prize for Excellence in the Arts, the Center for Asian American Media (CAAM), VCU School of the Arts Faculty Award of Excellence, grants from Creative Capital and was a Guggenheim Fellow in Film/Video in 2013.

Her film I AM won several awards in the US and India:

- Gay/Lesbian festival prize (2011), Great Lakes Film Festival
- Special Jury Awards (2011), KASHISH Mumbai International Queer Film Festival
- Audience choice award for documentary feature (2011), Philadelphia Asian American Film Festival
- Grand Jury Prize, 10th Asian Film Festival, Dallas TX
- Grand Jury Prize: Best Documentary, Indian Film Festival of Los Angeles (IFFLA)

== Filmography ==
- Occupy (work in progress)
- Bye Bye Lullaby (2023)
- Miles & Kilometres (2021)
- Big Time-my doodled diary (2015)
- I Am (2011)
- 24 Frames per Day (2008)
- Nalini by Day, Nancy by Night (2005)
- Where is there Room? (2002)
- Name I Call Myself (2001)
- Barefeet (2000)
- Sum Total (1999)

== Writings ==
- "Place of Safe Landing" Queer Potli - Memories, Imaginations and Re-Imaginations of Urban Queer Spaces in India, ed. Pawan Dhall, QI Publishing, 2016
- "The Fight to Live", Outlook, Outlook Publishing Group, 2 July 2015
- "Welcome to Your Own Festival: Review on Nigah QueerFest’07." Biblio: A Review of Books, Vol. XII Nos. 5 & 6, June 2007
- "Confessions of a Desidyke: A Filmmaker’s Journey from Ignorance." Trikone Magazine, Vol. 20, No.4 March 2006
- "Sum Total." Because I Have a Voice, Queer Politics in India, ed. Arvind Narrain and Gautam Bhan, Yoda Press, 2005
