= Foreign trade of India =

Foreign trade in India includes all imports and exports to and from India. At the central government level, trade is administered by the Ministry of Commerce and Industry. Foreign trade accounted for 46% of India's GDP in 2025. India is a net exporter of services and a net importer of merchandise. In 2025, the World Bank noted that the Indian economy is less open to trade now, than in the previous decade.

Until independence from the British in 1947, the government of India maintained semi-autonomous diplomatic relations and was a founding member of both the League of Nations and the United Nations. After independence, India joined the Commonwealth of Nations and adopted a foreign policy of non-alignment during the Cold War, while developing close economic ties with the Soviet Union. The country also followed Soviet-style economic policies and chose to remain largely closed to international trade until economic liberalisation, following a balance-of-payments crisis in July 1991.

Before liberalisation, average tariffs exceeded 200 percent, and imports were subject to extensive quantitative restrictions. Post 1991, foreign trade has been one of the major drivers of growth in the Indian economy. Economic reforms through the 1990s and 2000s gradually reduced tariffs and opened several sectors to foreign competition. India's share in global merchandise trade is less than 3%. Despite reforms, India continues to be among the most difficult countries to trade with and is one of the most frequent litigants at the World Trade Organization, both as a complainant seeking market access to other countries, and as a defendant supporting its tariff and non-tariff barriers to trade.

India's main merchandise exports are pharmaceuticals, oil and gas, gems and jewellery, automobiles and automobile parts, and raw agricultural commodities. However, the country's exports are spread across a variety of sectors.

== Historical background ==
India's trading history stretches back two millennia: the Periplus of the Erythraean Sea documents trade between India and the Mediterranean world. The Periplus was written by an anonymous sailor from Alexandria around 100 CE, and describes trade between countries, including India. European trade with India historically took place through the Silk Route, but intensified following Vasco da Gama's 1498 landing at Calicut. The Portuguese, Dutch, French, and British trading companies competed for access to Indian spices, textiles, and other goods for over three centuries following the discovery of a sea route to India.

In 1498, Portuguese explorer Vasco da Gama landed in Calicut (modern-day Kozhikode in Kerala), and was the first European to ever sail to India. The profit made during this trip made the Portuguese eager to trade more with India and attracted other European navigators and tradesmen. Pedro Álvares Cabral left for India in 1501 and established Portuguese trading posts in Calicut and Cochin (modern-day Kochi), returning to Portugal in 1501 with pepper, ginger, cinnamon, cardamom, nutmeg, mace, and cloves. The profits made from this trip were substantial.

Until independence, the Government of India maintained semi-autonomous diplomatic relations. It had colonies (such as the Aden Settlement), which sent and received full missions, and was a founding member of both the League of Nations and the United Nations. After India gained independence from the United Kingdom in 1947, it soon joined the Commonwealth of Nations and strongly supported independence movements in other colonies. During the Cold War, India adopted a foreign policy of non-alignment, but developed close ties with the Soviet Union.

=== 1991 economic reform ===
Before the 1991 economic liberalisation, India was largely a closed economy. Average tariffs exceeded 200 percent, and extensive quantitative restrictions on imports were imposed as part of the government's agenda to follow a 'socialist pattern of society' following the Avadi resolution of Indian National Congress in 1955. The country had a restrictive import policy from the late 1950s onwards. Foreign investment was restricted to allow only Indian ownership of businesses; import of any commodity required licencing and approval from the government. A World Bank report in 2025 noted that India was less open to trade in 2025, compared to the previous decade.

Since liberalisation, India's economy has improved mainly due to increased foreign trade. Reforms in India in the 1990s and 2000s aimed to increase international competitiveness in various sectors, including auto components, telecommunications, software, pharmaceuticals, biotechnology, research and development, and professional services. These reforms included reducing import tariffs, deregulating markets, and lowering taxes, which led to increased foreign investment and high economic growth. From 1992 to 2005, foreign investment increased by 316.9%, and India's GDP grew from $266 billion in 1991 to $3.96 trillion in 2025. However, India's share in global merchandise trade is less than 3 percent, while service exports are over 10% of its GDP in 2025.

== Trade policy ==
Despite 35 years of liberalisation, India's tariffs remain comparatively high among other major economies, and its regulatory environment continues to be an obstacle for its trading partners. Scholars have noted that the country still practices restrictive measures, such as quantitative restrictions and complex bureaucratic procedures.

=== Tariff barriers ===
According to the World Trade Organization's tariff and trade data, the simple average most-favoured nation tariff in 2025 was 15.8 percent, with an effective applied tariff rate of 5.4 percent across all commodities, compared to 2.2 percent in China, 1.8 percent in Indonesia, 1.1 percent in Vietnam, and 1.3 percent for the European Union. The 2025 National Trade Estimate Report on Foreign Trade Barriers, prepared by the United States Trade Representative, noted that India's tariffs were highest of any major world economy, with an applied tariff rate of 13.5 percent for non-agricultural goods and 39 percent for agricultural goods (applicable to US goods).

India maintains high tariffs on a wide range of goods; some examples include vegetable oils (up to 45%); apples, corn, and motorcycles (50%), automobiles and flowers (60%), natural rubber (70%), and alcoholic beverages (150%), in addition to high basic customs duties. The government of India often announces increased in tariffs in its annual budget without prior notices or public consultations, making the country an unreliable trade partner.

=== Non-tariff barriers ===
India maintains several non-tariff barriers, including many prohibited items, licence requirements for certain goods, and restrictions to sell only to government-controlled monopolies in some goods. It has also imposed mandatory Quality Control Orders on hundreds of items through the Bureau of Indian Standards, making domestic testing and certification by a government-approved laboratory mandatory. Additionally, the country has placed price controls on medical devices. Import licencing is maintained for over 400 products, Sanitary and phytosanitary measures on 250 product categories, and technical barriers to trade on about 228 product categories. Further, India has been accused of inconsistently applying customs procedures and recurring customs-valuation disputes.

== Relations with WTO ==
India has been one of the most active users of the World Trade Organization's dispute settlement mechanism since its establishment in 1995. As of August 2026, there are nine trade disputes pending against India. The disputes involve production-linked incentives, tariffs on information and communication technology products, safeguard measures for certain iron and steel products, and support to the sugar industry.

As per the WTO database on dispute settlement, which lists 646 total disputes, India has initiated 24 cases and has been a respondent in 34 cases. It has participated in 187 cases as a third party, making it an interested party in over one-third of cases. Scholars have alleged that India is a force for obstruction at the WTO, partnering with different groups of countries and disrupting the organization.

Both developing and developed countries have accused India of holding up the WTO reform process. Being the only dissenter, the country had blocked the historic Trade Facilitation Agreement in 2014. In July 2023, along with Turkey and South Africa, India blocked the Investment Facilitation for Development agreement. In March 2026, after South Africa and Turkey withdrew their objections, it remained the only country to oppose the IFD agreement.

== Trade in services ==
As of 2023, India is the seventh-largest exporter of commercial services in the world, accounting for 4.6% of global trade in services. India's service exports grew by 27% in FY 2023. In September 2023, India's services industry accelerated, helped by robust demand in the sector. A recent survey also indicated that businesses displayed the highest level of optimism in over nine years. According to S&P Global's India services purchasing managers' index, the index rose to 61.0 in September 2023, compared to 60.1 in the preceding month. This surpassed projections in a Reuters poll, which had anticipated a slight dip to 59.5.

The spectrum of India's services exports encompasses a diverse array of sectors, ranging from information technology (IT) to the provision of medical services by professionals overseas. The RBI, while not providing monthly disaggregated data on services exports, periodically releases a classification of such exports as part of its quarterly balance of payments data. This classification encompasses transport, travel, construction, insurance and pensions, financial services, telecommunications, computer and information services, as well as personal, cultural, recreational services, among other business services.

Within India's services export landscape, software exports retain a dominant position. However, noteworthy is the recent surge in "other business services" exports, which constituted 24 percent of the total services exports in the initial nine months (April–December) of FY23. This marks a notable increase from the 19 percent reported in FY14. This category encompasses a range of services including legal services, accounting, auditing, book-keeping, tax consultancy services, management consulting, managerial and public relations services, as well as advertising, market research, and public opinion polling services.

== Exports and imports ==
Exports of India by product category (2019) Chemical products Transportation Machines Mineral products Plastics and rubbers Metals Foodstuffs Precious metals Textiles Instruments Animal products Vegetable products Paper goods Footwear and headwear Miscellaneous Stone and glass Wood products Animal and vegetable bi-products Animal hides Arts and antiques Weapons

India exports approximately 7500 commodities to about 190 countries, and imports around 6000 commodities from 140 countries.

=== Pharmaceutical industry ===
The pharmaceutical industry in India was valued at an estimated US$50 billion in FY 2023-24 and is estimated to reach $130 billion by 2030. India is often described as the “pharmacy of the world,” supplying around one-fifth of global demand for generic medicines and exporting pharmaceuticals to over 200 countries in 2023–24, with approximately 70% of exports destined for highly regulated markets such as North America and Europe. In the United States, Indian pharmaceutical companies supply nearly half of all generic prescriptions by volume. India is also the largest vaccine manufacturer globally by volume, accounting for over 60% of the world’s vaccine production.

According to Economic Survey 2023, the turnover in the domestic pharmaceutical market was estimated to be $41 billion. India's pharmaceutical exports revenue was $25.3 billion in fiscal year 2022–23, according to the data released by Pharmexcil. India ranked third globally in terms of dollar value of drugs and medicines exports.

Major pharmaceutical hubs in India are, broadly anticlockwise from the northwest: Baddi, Paonta Sahib, Sikkim, Kolkata, Visakhapatnam, Hyderabad, Bangalore, Mysore, Chennai, Pondicherry, Goa, Mumbai, Navi Mumbai, Pune, Aurangabad, Indore, Pithampur, Ahmedabad, Vadodara, Ankleshwar, and Vapi.

=== Oil and gas industry ===
India is the second biggest oil importer after China and is highly dependent on imported crude oil. The net imports of crude oil rose from 178.973 Mt during 2011–12 to 226.95 Mt during 2020–21. The net imports of natural gas increased from 18 BCM in 2011–12 to 32.86 BCM in 2020–21, recording a CAGR of 9.44%. Despite the dependence on imports, India has developed sufficient processing capacity over the years to produce different petroleum products. As result, India is a net exporter of petroleum products. The export of petroleum products increased from 38.94 Mt in 2008–09 to 56.76 Mt during 2020–21.

India has an 82.8% import dependence for crude oil and 45.3% for natural gas. Due to lack of adequate petroleum reserves, India has to depend mostly on crude oil imports for the near future till its renewable energy resources, such as solar, wind, hydro and biomass, are developed adequately to achieve energy security by replacing petroleum products consumption, which also significantly contributes to air pollution.

India has significantly increased its Russian oil imports since the start of the Russian invasion of Ukraine due to deep discounts, making Russia a top supplier. In 2025, several top U.S. officials and political figures have accused India of effectively financing Russia’s war in Ukraine by serving as a major buyer of Russian energy. In late 2025, the United States, European Union, and United Kingdom significantly escalated sanctions against Russia's two largest oil producers, Rosneft and Lukoil, to curtail the financing of the war in Ukraine. These measures have significantly disrupted India's oil trade, leading to a sharp decline in imports from these specific entities.

On 19 December 2025, Ukraine’s Security Service (SBU) conducted a first-of-its-kind long-range drone strike on a "shadow fleet" oil tanker in the Mediterranean Sea, targeting a vessel that had recently delivered oil to India.

=== Diamond Processing ===
India's diamond industry, which is estimated to grow by an average 10 to 15 percent each year in the next five years, accounts for 70–75 percent of total diamond exports in the world and employs 850,000 people, making it the largest cutting hub by value and number of employees. Last year, the country's import of rough diamonds rose 24.5 percent to 149.8 million carats against a year earlier, and export of cut and polished diamonds witnessed a surge of 28.3 percent to 59.9 million carats. The old market is located at Opera House and Prasad Chambers (Charni Road).

The cutting and polishing of diamonds occurs mainly in the city of Surat, which is also known as 'Diamond City'. The cutting and polishing units in Surat vary from large firms employing several thousands of diamond cutting and polishing workers to very small informal enterprises having a few workers. The larger Cutting and Polishing of Diamonds (CPD) units have relatively better work and employment conditions and even provide for elaborate benefits. Most of the CPD units are owned by Kathiawadis, who were originally farmers from Northern Gujarat region. The whole diamond cutting and polishing industry is largely community oriented, where most of the owners and workers are Kathiawadis. In the recession of 2008, while many of the small and medium-sized CPD units were closed down with lay-off of workers, there were still some big CPD enterprises who managed to retain their workforce. This was primarily because of the paternal approach of owners, by which they consider workers as extended family members

=== Automotive Industry ===
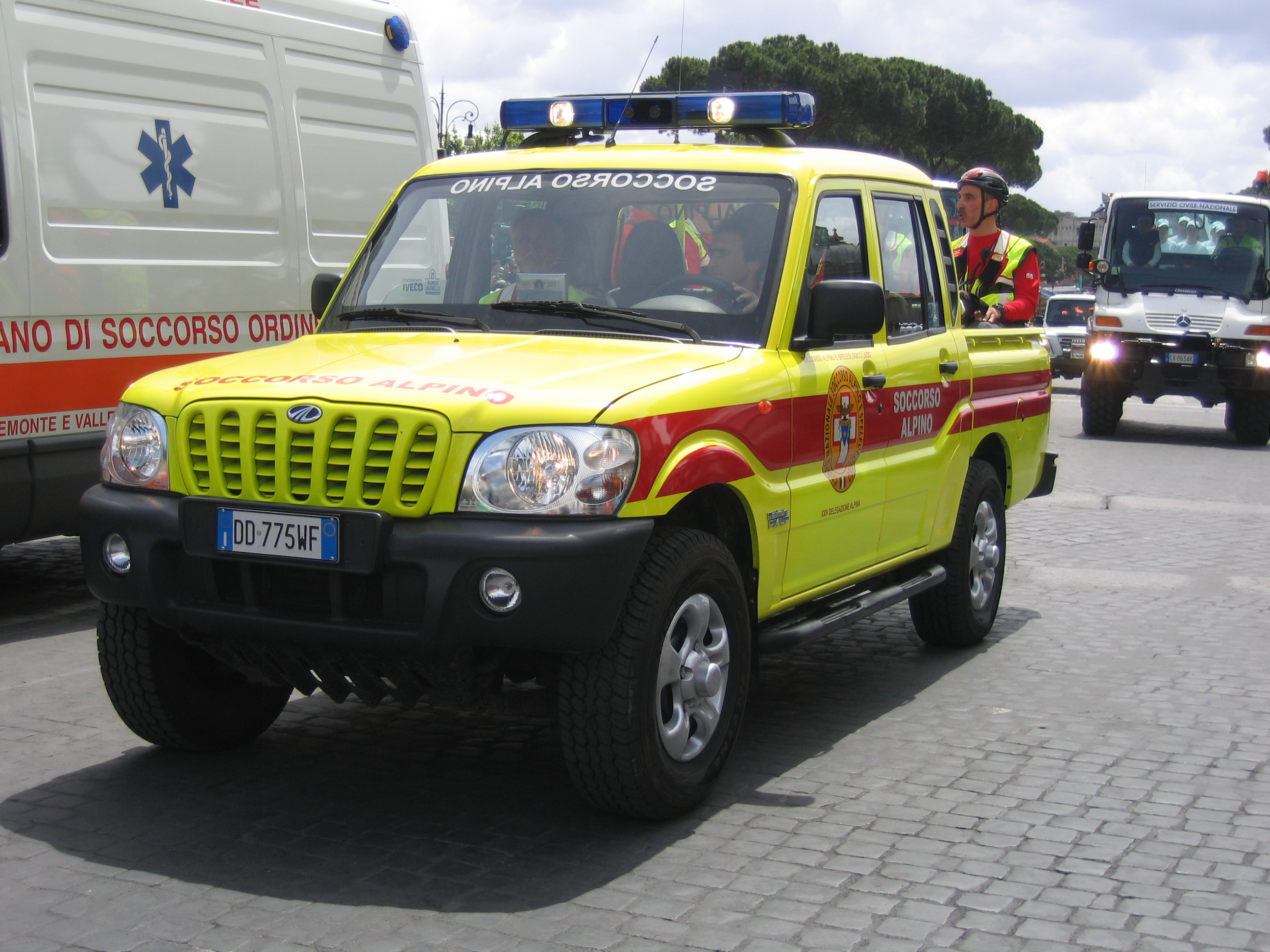
2007 Mahindra Scorpio Pickup in service with Italy's CNSAS

In 2025, India became world's third largest manufacturer of vehicles, and exported 50% of its two-wheeler production. India's automobile exports have grown consistently and reached $4.5 billion in 2009, with the United Kingdom being India's largest export market, followed by Italy, Germany, the Netherlands, and South Africa.

According to The New York Times, India's strong engineering base and expertise in the manufacturing of low-cost, fuel-efficient cars has resulted in the expansion of manufacturing facilities of several automobile companies like Hyundai, Nissan, Toyota, Volkswagen, and Maruti Suzuki.

In 2008, Hyundai alone exported 240,000 cars made in India. Nissan planned to export 250,000 vehicles manufactured in its India plant by 2011. Similarly, US automobile company, General Motors had announced its plans to export about 50,000 cars manufactured in India by 2011.

In September 2009, Ford announced its plans to set up a plant in India with an annual capacity of 250,000 cars, for US$500 million. The cars were manufactured both for the Indian market and for export. The company said that the plant was a part of its plan to make India the hub for its global production business. Fiat had announced that it would source more than US$1 billion worth auto components from India.

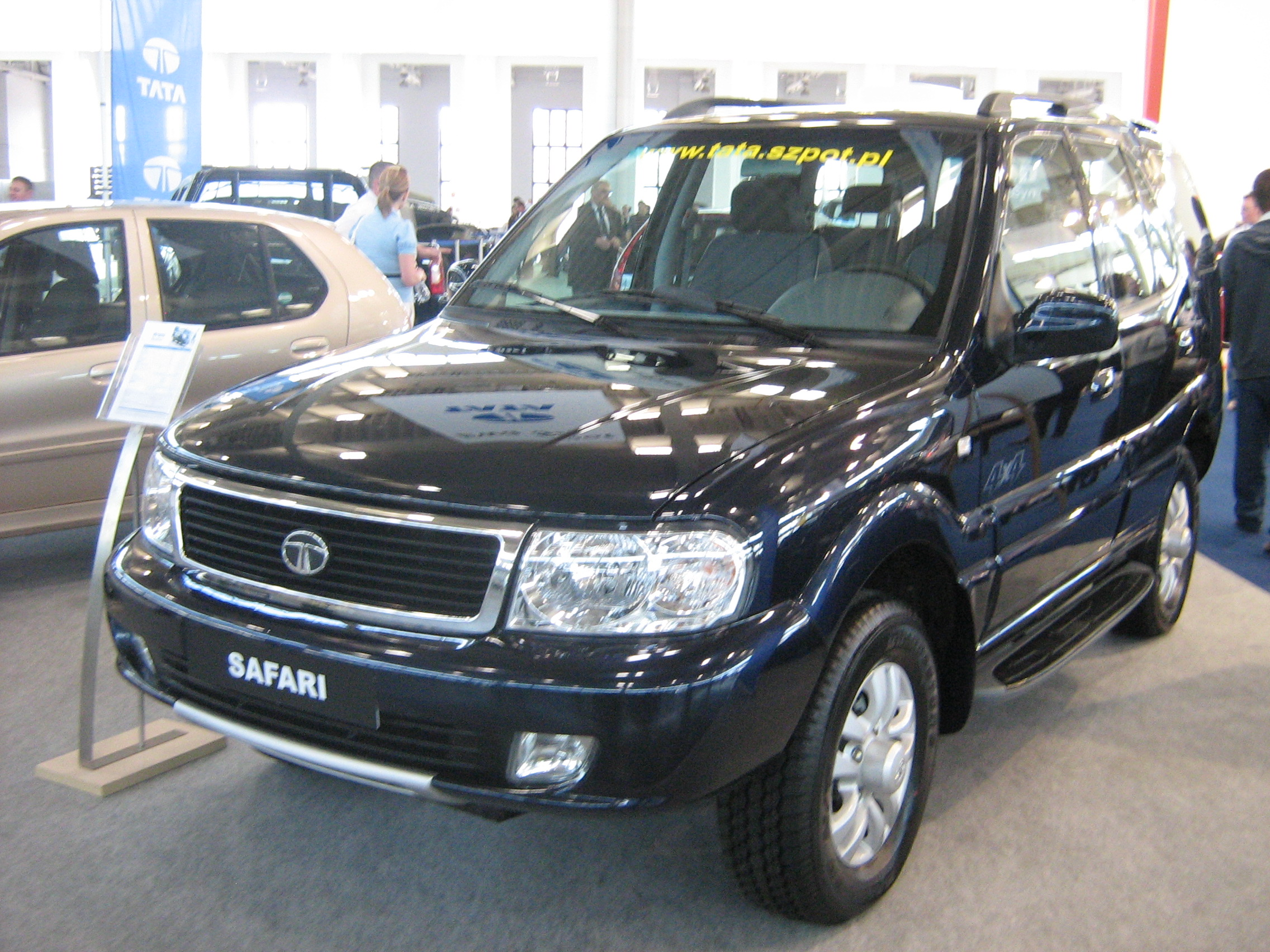
A Tata Safari on display in Poznań, Poland

In 2009, India (0.23m) surpassed China (0.16m) as Asia's fourth largest exporter of cars after Japan (1.77m), Korea (1.12m) and Thailand (0.26m).

In July 2010, The Economic Times reported that PSA Peugeot Citroën was planning to re-enter the Indian market and open a production plant in Andhra Pradesh that would have an annual capacity of 100,000 vehicles, investing €700M in the operation. Citroën entered the market in 2021 with their first offering being the Citroën C5 Aircross.

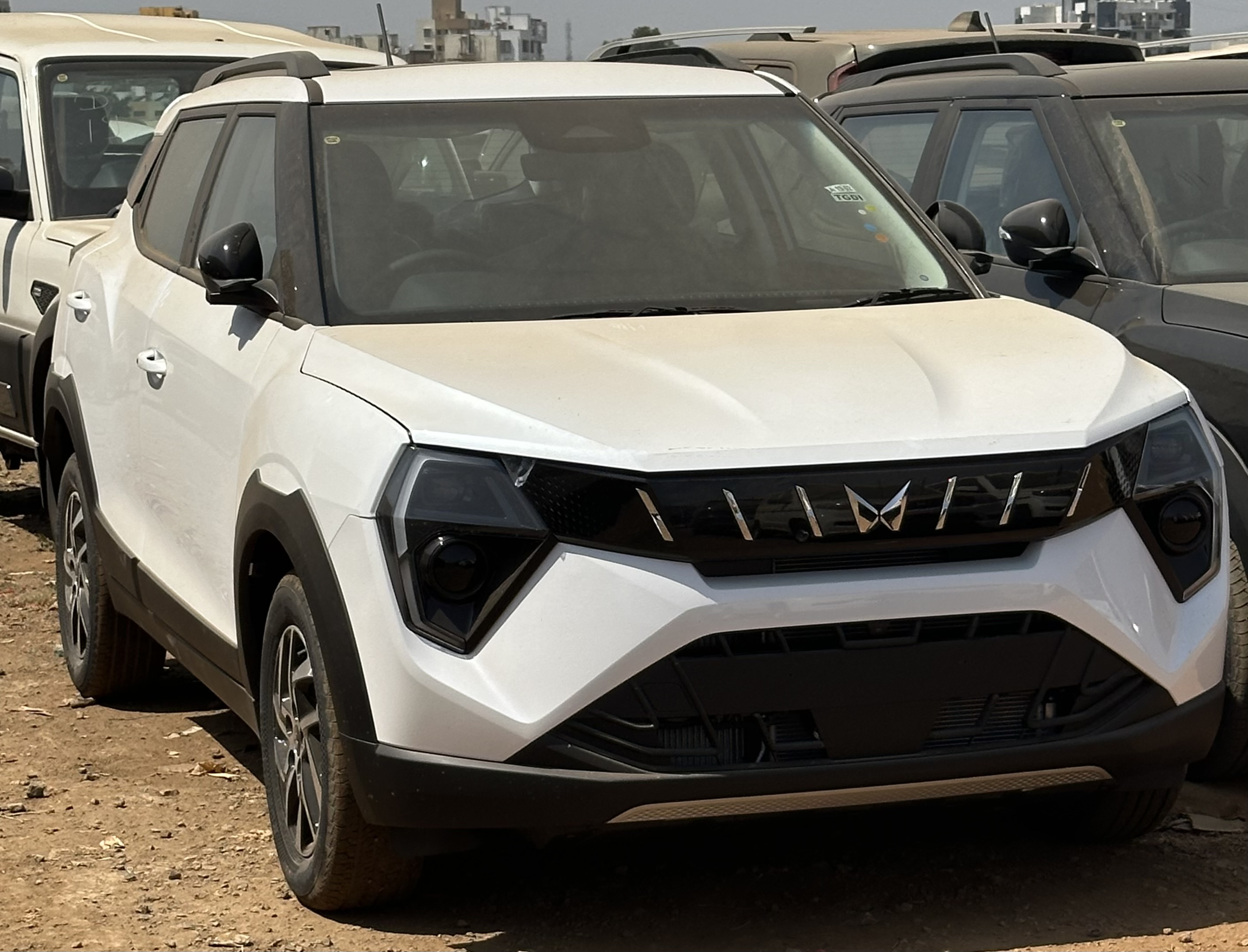
2025 Mahindra 3XO at a dealership in India

In recent years, India has emerged as a leading center for the manufacture of small cars. Maruti Suzuki and Hyundai are the two biggest exporters of cars from the country. Nissan also exports small cars from its Indian assembly line. Tata Motors exports its passenger vehicles to several Asian and African markets. In the 2000s, Mahindra & Mahindra prepared to introduce its pickup trucks and small SUV models in the U.S. market, but canceled its plans. As of 2019, it is assembling and selling an off-road vehicle (Mahindra Roxor; not certified for road use) in limited numbers in the U.S. It is also sold in Canada. While the possibilities for the Indian automobile industry are impressive, there are challenges that could thwart future growth. Since the demand for automobiles in recent years is directly linked to overall economic expansion and rising personal incomes, industry growth will slow if the economy weakens.

Mahindra's major overseas markets include Australia, South Africa, New Zealand, United States and South Asia.

India's exports reached a record of nearly $90 billion, comprising merchandise exports of $49.47 billion (up 45.06 per cent year on year) and estimated services exports of $40.51 billion, according to Commerce Ministry data released on 13 November 2026.

== Trade statistics ==
Overall foreign trade data in billion US$

FY	Merchandise Exports	Merchandise Imports	Total Merchandise Trade	Merchandise Trade Balance	Service Exports	Service Imports	Total Service Trade	Service Trade Balance	Net Overall Trade
2024-25	437.416	720.243	1157.659	-282.827	387.540	198.717	586.257	+188.823	-94.004
2023-24	437.072	678.215	1115.287	-241.143	341.107	178.324	519.431	+162.783	-78.360

Summary table of recent India foreign trade (in billion $):

Year	Export	Import	Trade Deficit
1999	36.3	50.2	-13.9
2000	43.1	60.8	-17.7
2001	42.5	54.5	-12.0
2002	44.5	53.8	-9.3
2003	48.3	61.6	-13.3
2004	57.24	74.15	-16.91
2005	69.18	89.33	-20.15
2006	76.23	113.1	-36.87
2007	112.0	100.9	11.1
2008	176.4	305.5	-129.1
2009	168.2	274.3	-106.1
2010	201.1	327.0	-125.9
2011	299.4	461.4	-162.0
2012	298.4	500.4	-202.0
2013	313.2	467.5	-154.3
2014	318.2	462.9	-144.7
2015	310.3	447.9	-137.6
2016	262.3	381	-118.7
2017	275.8	384.3	-108.5
2018	303.52	465.58	-162.05
2019	330.07	514.07	-184
2020	314.31	467.19	-158.88
2021	420	612	-192
2022	676.53	760.06	-83.53
2023	770.18	892.18	-122
2024	820.93	915.19	-94.26

== Trading partners of India ==
According to the Ministry of Commerce and Industry, the twenty-five largest trading partners of India represent 77.6% of total trade by India in the financial year 2025–26. These figures include trade in goods and commodities, but do not include services or foreign direct investment.The two largest goods traded by India are mineral fuels (refined / unrefined) and gold (finished gold ware / gold metal). In the year 2013–14, mineral fuels (HS code 27) were the largest traded item with 181.383 billion US$ worth imports and 64.685 billion US$ worth re-exports after refining. In the year 2024–2025, gold and its finished items (HS code 71) were the second-largest traded items with 55.846 billion US$ worth imports and 41.692 billion US$ worth re-exports after value addition, and a significant amount of this Gold is being imported from Japan as Gold Chemical Compounds to save duty and import tax free under India-Japan Economic Partnership which is not only hurting import tax revenue but widening trade deficit. These two goods are constituting 53% total imports, 34% total exports and nearly 100% of total trade deficit (136 billion US$) of India in the financial year 2013–14. The services trade (exports and imports) are not part of commodities trade. The trade surplus in services trade is US$70 billion in the year 2017–18.Counting the European Union (EU) as one, the World Trade Organisation (WTO) ranks India fifth for commercial services exports and sixth for commercial services imports.The two primary destinations of India's exports are the EU and the United States, whereas the China and the EU are the two primary countries from which India's imports come from. These figures include trade in goods and commodities, but do not include services or foreign direct investment

== See also ==
- Economy of India
- Foreign relations of India
- Remittances to India
- Business process outsourcing to India
- List of exports of India
- List of Indian states and union territories by exports
- List of largest trading partners of India
- Indian diaspora
- Indianisation
- Directorate General of Foreign Trade (DGFT)
- Merchandise Export from India Scheme
- Make in India
- India Inc.
- Medical tourism in India
- Electronics and semiconductor manufacturing industry in India
- Directorate General of Trade Remedies
