= Diéguez =

Diéguez is a surname. Notable people with the surname include:

- Adrián Diéguez (born 1996), Spanish footballer
- José Diéguez Reboredo (1934–2022), Spanish Roman Catholic prelate
- Margarita Diéguez Armas, Mexican diplomat
- Míriam Diéguez (born 1986), Spanish footballer
- Rosario Hernández Diéguez (1916–1936), Spanish Galician newspaper hawker and trade unionist
