= Genpact =

Bermuda-domiciled professional services firm

Genpact Ltd.
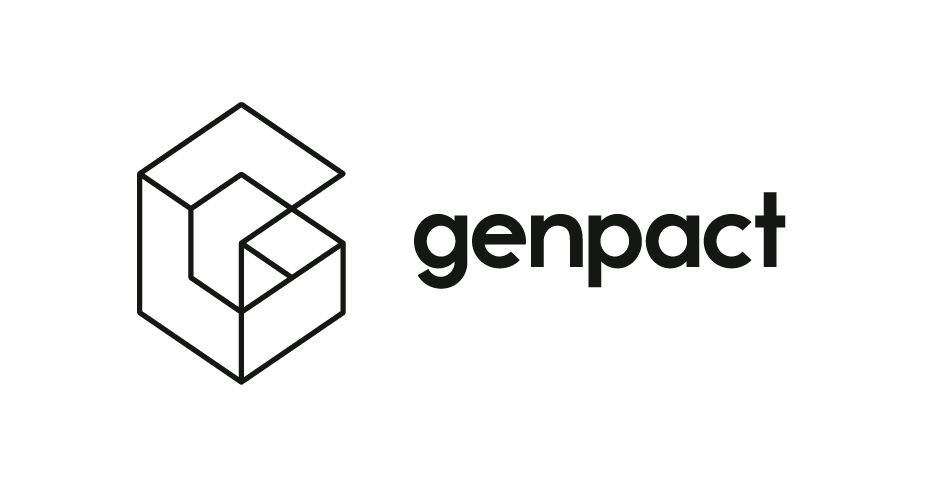
- Type: Public
- Traded as: NYSE: G S&P 400 Component
- ISIN: BMG3922B1072
- Industry: Information technology Consulting; Outsourcing
- Founded: 1997; 29 years ago Gurgaon, India
- Headquarters: New York City, New York, U.S.
- Key people: Balkrishan "BK" Kalra (CEO)
- Revenue: ▲$5.08 billion (2025)
- Operating income: ▲$750 million (2025)
- Net income: ▼$552 million (2025)
- Total assets: ▲$4.81 billion (2023)
- Total equity: ▲$2.25 billion (2023)
- Number of employees: 146,500 (2025)
- Website: www.genpact.com

Genpact Ltd. is an American information technology services, consulting, and outsourcing company headquartered in New York City, New York. Founded in Gurgaon, India, and legally domiciled in Bermuda, Genpact employs more than 125,000 people and provides services to clients in over 30 countries worldwide. Genpact is listed on the NYSE and generated revenues of US$5.08 billion in 2025.

== History ==
=== Founding and early developments ===
Genpact was founded in 1997 as a unit of General Electric. The company was founded as GE Capital International Services (GECIS) in Gurgaon. Starting with 20 employees under the leadership of CEO Pramod Bhasin, its charter was to provide business process outsourcing solutions to GE's businesses. In the beginning, GECIS created processes for outsourcing back-office activities for GE Capital such as processing car loans and credit card transactions. It was an experimental concept at the time and the beginning of the business process outsourcing (BPO) industry.

One year after its launch, GECIS employed about 800 people and generated revenues of US$4 million. By 2001, GECIS operations had grown to 12,000 employees and the company began to manage a wide range of processes across GE's financial services and manufacturing businesses. Jack Welch, CEO of GE at the time, said that GECIS was a key driver of GE's growth between 1998 and 2001, and was responsible for reducing operating costs by approximately US$1 billion.

In 2003, GE reduced its stake in GECIS to 40% and sold the remainder to two American private equity firms. At the time of the sale, GECIS employed around 13,000 people in India and 4,000 people in the US, China, Hungary and Mexico, providing a range of solutions in areas such as finance and accounting, insurance claim processing, IT management and technical support.

By 2004, GECIS oversaw around 700 business processes for GE that had migrated from the US to India, generating revenues of US$426 million.

=== Independence and international growth ===
In January 2005, the company became independent and started to serve clients outside of GE. As part of this transition, the company changed its name to Genpact for “generating business impact.” Also in 2005, the company opened additional offices in India and by the end of the year, recorded US$493 million in revenue, with 15% coming from new global clients, and the remaining 85% from GE. In 2006, Genpact further expanded in India, the Philippines, Mexico and China.

In August 2007, Genpact was listed on the NYSE under the symbol 'G'. The company continued to grow, opening offices in six additional countries that same year and launching a joint venture with the Indian company NDTV to offer outsourcing services for the media industry. In 2008, the company crossed US$1 billion in revenue, with 53% coming from clients other than GE.

From 2010 onward, the company increasingly focused its operations and presence in Europe and the US. As part of its shift west, the company moved its headquarters to New York and in 2011, Bhasin stepped down as CEO and became non-executive vice chairman of the company. He was succeeded on 17 June 2011 by NV "Tiger”" Tyagarajan, who was appointed to the Board of Directors and became Genpact's new CEO. Tyagarajan was previously CEO of Genpact from 1999 to 2002, when he led the business through a critical growth phase as a subsidiary of GE. When Genpact became an independent company, he rejoined the firm from GE Capital U.S. as executive vice president of sales and business development from 2005 to 2009. Thereafter, he took on the role of the firm's chief operating officer, before being named CEO in 2011.

Bain Capital became the firm's largest shareholder in October 2012.

In February 2019, Genpact contractors in Hyderabad who were assigned content moderation tasks for Facebook reportedly experienced psychological trauma while evaluating videos depicting suicide, torture, terrorism, and pornography.

=== Recent developments ===
On February 9, 2024, Balkrishan Kalra (“BK”) assumed the role of President and CEO. He replaced Tiger Tyagarajan, who retired.

In September 2020, UK Medicines and Healthcare products Regulatory Agency contracted Genpact to supply an Artificial intelligence software tool to process the expected high volume of COVID-19 vaccine Adverse drug reactions to ensure that no details from the ADRs reaction texts are missed. MHRA and Genpact announced an expansion of the partnership in January 2022. In August 2021, Genpact signed a multi-year digital transformation contract with Coca-Cola Beverages in Africa.

During the COVID-19 pandemic, Genpact opened its internal learning and reskilling platform, "Genome", to public access.

That same year, the company expanded its operations in Germany, and was added to the S&P 400 Mid-Cap Index. The company also signed an agreement with the National Institute of Industrial Engineering in Mumbai to establish a Digital Manufacturing and Supply Chain center, supporting the transformation from traditional to digital manufacturing.

In 2022, Genpact was added to the Bloomberg Gender Equality Index.

=== Acquisitions ===
- April 2011: Headstrong, a software services company based in Noida
- April 2016: Endeavour Software Technologies, an enterprise mobility software company
- August 2016, PNMsoft a British/Israeli software company that focused on Business Process Management (BPM) systems.
- August 2017: TandemSeven, an experience design company
- September 2017: OnSource, a provider of an Inspection-as-a-Service (IaaS) product for property and casualty (P&C) insurance carriers and their customers
- June 2018: Commonwealth Informatics, a provider of cloud-based drug safety analytics products and services for medical research and healthcare delivery
- July 2018: Barkawi Management Consultants, a supply chain management firm
- January 2019: riskCanvas, an end-to-end Financial Crimes software platform
- October 2019, Rightpoint, a digital consultancy
- January 2021: Enquero, a data engineering and analytics firm

== Corporate affairs ==
=== Organizational structure ===
Genpact operates worldwide and is currently active in more than 30 countries.

=== Management structure ===
Genpact is managed by a leadership team of 13 members (2024), that the company refers to as Genpact Leadership Council.

== Products ==
In June 2017, Genpact announced Genpact Cora, an artificial intelligence (AI)-based platform for enterprises. The platform has an application program interface (API) design and open architecture that includes Genpact's own intellectual property as well as other providers. The platform's claimed benefits include deciphering large chunks of data, seamless customer service, faster financial reporting, and increasing speed to market.

== See also ==
- List of IT consulting firms
