= Pramod =

Male given name

Pramod means joy or happiness in Sanskrit and is one of the names of the Hindu god Ganesh.

People with the name "Pramod":

- A. N. Pramod (fl. 1990s–2020s), Indian Navy Vice Admiral
- Pramod Bhasin (fl. 1960s–2020s), Indian businessman
- Pramod Chakravorty (1929–2004), Indian director and film producer
- Pramod Kamble (born 1964), Indian painter and sculptor
- Pramod Kapoor (born 1953), Indian writer and publisher
- Pramod Kharel (born 1979), Nepalese singer
- Pramod Kureel (born 1966), Indian politician
- Pramod Madushan (born 1993), Sri Lankan cricketer
- Pramod Mahajan (1949–2006), Indian politician
- Pramod Moutho (born 1955), Indian actor
- Pramod Panju (fl. 2010s–2020s), Indian actor
- Namitha Pramod (born 1996), Indian actress
- Ranjan Pramod (fl. 2000s–2020s), Indian screenwriter and director
- Pramod Sawant (born 1973), Indian politician
- Pramod Tiwari (born 1952), Indian politician
- Pramodya Wickramasinghe (born 1971), Sri Lankan cricketer
