= Indian Trade =

Indian Trade could refer to:

- Native American trade, historic trading between the Indigenous people of North America and European settlers
- Foreign trade of India, imports and exports to and from India
