= Nalini by Day, Nancy by Night =

- Directed by: Sonali Gulati
- Written by: Sonali Gulati
- Distributed by: Women Make Movies
- Release date: 2005
- Running time: 27 minutes
- Language: English

Nalini by Day, Nancy by Night is a 2005 documentary film by filmmaker Sonali Gulati.

This film explores business process outsourcing in India. Told from the perspective of an Indian living in the United States, the film provides a glimpse into India's call centers, where telemarketers acquire American names and accents to service the telephone-support industry of the U.S. The film incorporates animation as a way to build in personal narrative in a doodle-like manner. It also includes live action footage which takes the form of cinema verité and innovatively edited interviews, and archival footage that provides contextual analysis to the socio-political history of globalization and capitalism. The film is a commentary on identity in the new millennium that intersects diaspora with global outsourcing. It was first shown at the 2005 Margaret Mead Film Festival.

== See also ==
- Bombay Calling
