= Promptitude =

Legal term for acting without delay

In a legal context, promptitude refers to a duty or intention to act without delay. Its opposite is tardiness, also called (in Scots law), mora. Legislation or judicial rules may require actions to be taken promptly or within a specified timescale, or may provide for actions not taken promptly or within a specified timescale to be ineffective or less effective than actions taken promptly.

== Examples ==
=== India ===
- The Banking, Public Financial Institutions and Negotiable Instruments Laws (Amendment) Act, 1988, which amended the Negotiable Instruments Act, 1881, established that payment of a cheque not presented to the bank within six months from the date on which it was drawn could not be enforced if the account against which it was drawn did not have sufficient funds.

=== Ireland ===
- Order 84A of the Rules of the Superior Court was revised by the Irish Government on 8 September 2010 to make Irish practice on public procurement challenges consistent with EU law. The rule requires that actions be brought within 30 calendar days of when the claimant "knew or ought to have known" of the alleged infringement".

=== United Kingdom ===
- A claim for a judicial review of the lawfulness of legislation or of a public decision or action must be filed "promptly, and in any event not later than 3 months after the grounds to make the claim first arose". In R. v Independent Television Commission ex parte TV Northern Ireland Ltd (1996), it was held that "It is not correct to proceed on the basis that applicants have three months in which to seek judicial review", because they are also required to act "with the utmost promptitude".
- When first implemented, UK public procurement review legislation required bidders wishing to challenge a public body's procurement decisions (in situations where the Public Contracts Regulations applied) to bring proceedings "promptly, and in any event within three months from the date when bringing the proceedings first arose. However, in 2010 in a legal case raised between Uniplex (UK) Ltd. and the NHS Business Services Authority, the European Court of Justice declared that the word "promptly" was not sufficiently clear and precise to comply with European Union (EU) law. Article 1 of the EU's Directive on the coordination of the laws, regulations and administrative provisions relating to the application of review procedures to the award of public supply and public works contracts (Directive 89/665/EEC, then in force) required Member States to "take the measures necessary to ensure that, as regards contract award procedures ..., decisions taken by the contracting authorities may be reviewed effectively and, in particular, as rapidly as possible", but precise wording, such as "within three months" but without the "promptly, and" aspect, was necessary to ensure sufficient certainty and predictability. Amendments to the UK procurement law taking account of the court ruling were implemented in October 2011.

== See also ==
- Speed
