= Directorate General of Trade Remedies =

Indian government trade remedies agency

- व्यापार उपचार महानिदेशालय

Agency overview
- Formed: May 2018
- Preceding agency: Directorate General of Anti-Dumping and Allied Duties
- Jurisdiction: India
- Ministers responsible: Piyush Goyal, Cabinet Minister; Jitin Prasada, Minister of State
- Agency executive: Amitabh Kumar, Additional Secretary & Director General
- Website: https://www.dgtr.gov.in/en

The Directorate General of Trade Remedies (DGTR) is a quasi-judicial body under the Department of Commerce in India's Ministry of Commerce and Industry. It investigates and recommends anti-dumping, countervailing and safeguard measures on imports. The finance ministry decides whether to impose the recommendations. The DGTR was created in May 2018 from the Directorate General of Anti-Dumping and Allied Duties, and it took over safeguard functions from two other bodies. World Trade Organisation's (WTO) data shows that India had filed 17% of global anti-dumping petitions by 2022. The finance ministry's rejection of many DGTR recommendations since 2020 has led to public disagreements and litigation between the two ministries.

== History ==
India imposed its first anti-dumping duty in 1992. A 2010 paper by the United States International Trade Commission linked rising use of anti-dumping duties and other administrative measures to falling tariff protection after the 1991 reforms. Before 2018, the Directorate General of Anti-Dumping and Allied Duties handled anti-dumping and anti-subsidy cases and safeguards duties were imposed by the Directorate General of Safeguards under the Ministry of Finance. The Directorate General of Foreign Trade imposed quantitative restrictions on imports. In May 2018, the government combined all of these into DGTR. The commerce ministry described DGTR as the "apex national authority for administering all trade remedial measures" to ensure a level-playing field for domestic industry.

== Legal framework ==
The DGTR handles anti-dumping, countervailing duty, safeguard measures, quantitative measures, and tariff-rate cases. Its legal authority comes from the Customs Tariff Act, 1975. It also assists domestic industry and exporters facing trade remedy investigations started by other WTO members. The Supreme Court of India has held that courts cannot exercise continuous supervision of cases that the DGTR investigates, as these are specialised, time-bound investigations.

== Measures ==
India's trade policy review at the WTO in July 2026 notes that it is a major user of trade remedies, with 226 anti-dumping investigations notified and 170 anti-dumping measures in force in the review period (January 2021 to June 2025). The country started 9 countervailing investigations and imposed 12 measures from 1 January 2021 to 30 June 2025. A 2022 analysis by the Vietnam Chamber of Commerce and Industry found India to be the "most frequent user" of anti-dumping measures till 2021. The analysis found that India initiated 1100 cases and imposed 767 anti-dumping measures, accounting for over 17% of the total 4350 measures applied by all WTO members from 1995 to 2021 (the period includes data from before the DGTR was formed).

In March 2025, the DGTR recommended a 12% safeguard duty on certain steel products for 200 days, following a complaint by the Indian Steel Association. The finance ministry imposed a 12% duty on steel, to be reduced to 11% by April 2027. In October 2025, the DGTR recommended imposing an anti-dumping duty of 23 to 30% on solar cells from China.

== See also ==
- Directorate General of Foreign Trade
- Ministry of Commerce and Industry (India)
- Ministry of Finance (India)
- Foreign trade of India
