= Merchandise Export from India Scheme =

Merchandise Export from India Scheme (MEIS)
- Country: India
- Prime Minister(s): Narendra Modi
- Launched: April 1, 2015; 10 years ago
- Website: Official website

The Merchandise Export from India Scheme (MEIS) is an Indian government initiative implemented by the Government of India with the objective of encouraging exports. It was launched on April 1, 2015, as a part of the Foreign Trade Policy (FTP) to boost India's exports of goods and services.

== Overview ==
MEIS aims to incentivize and support Indian exporters by providing them with financial assistance in the form of duty credits. Under this scheme, exporters are granted transferable duty credits that can be used to pay various duties, including basic customs duty, countervailing duty, and special additional duty. These credits can be utilized for both the payment of customs duties on imported goods and the payment of excise duty on domestic procurements.

== Eligibility ==
To be eligible for MEIS benefits, exporters need to fulfill certain criteria. They must have a valid Importer-Exporter Code (IEC) and should have exported goods under the specified list of eligible sectors and products. The scheme covers a wide range of sectors, including manufacturing, agriculture, textiles, handicrafts, engineering goods, chemicals, and electronics.

== Implementation and administration ==
The MEIS is implemented and administered by the Directorate General of Foreign Trade (DGFT), which operates under the Ministry of Commerce and Industry, Government of India. The DGFT is responsible for issuing duty credit scrips and monitoring the scheme's implementation.

The scheme has undergone periodic revisions to accommodate changing export priorities and to align with international trade agreements. The DGFT periodically updates the list of eligible sectors and products and revises the rates of duty credit scrips based on market conditions and trade objectives.

== Criticisms and controversies ==
The MEIS has faced certain criticisms and controversies. Some critics argue that the scheme may encourage export dependency and discourage domestic manufacturing. Others have raised concerns about potential misuse or abuse of duty credit scrips, leading to revenue losses for the government.

== See also ==
- Foreign trade of India
- Directorate General of Foreign Trade (DGFT)
