= Directorate General of Foreign Trade =

Indian government agency

- विदेश व्यापार महानिदेशालय

Agency overview
- Preceding agency: Chief Controller of Imports and Exports
- Jurisdiction: India
- Ministers responsible: Piyush Goyal, Cabinet Minister; Jitin Prasada, Minister of State
- Agency executive: Lav Agarwal

The Directorate General of Foreign Trade (DGFT) is an attached office of India's Ministry of Commerce and Industry, headed by the Director General of Foreign Trade. It is responsible for making and implementing India's foreign trade policy, with export promotion as its main objective. Until 1991, the office was known as the Chief Controller of Imports and Exports. The legal mandate of the organisation comes from the Foreign Trade (Development and Regulation) Act, 1992.

== History ==
Until the Economic liberalisation in 1991, the DGFT was mainly concerned with regulating foreign trade. After liberalisation, it acts as a "facilitator", a move away from prohibiting and controlling imports and exports. The office was known as the Chief Controller of Imports and Exports (CCI&E) until 1991. In 2017, the Ministry of Commerce and Industry planned a revamp of the directorate after the introduction of the Goods and Services Tax. The Foreign Trade (Development and Regulation) Act, 1992, replaced the Imports and Exports (Control) Act, 1947.

== Functions ==
The government notifies India's foreign trade policies under Section 5 of the 1991 Act; the current policy, Foreign Trade Policy, 2023, became effective from 1 April 2023. The main functions of the organisation include:

- issuing the import-export code, which authorises the holders to buy or sell goods in the international markets;
- notifying changes to India's import-export policy for specified goods;
- advising exporters; and
- making and implement government schemes related to export promotion.

The DGFT website offers a searchable database of all importers and exporters holding the IEC.

== Organisation ==
The DGFT is headquartered at Vanijya Bhavan on Akbar Road in New Delhi. According to its website, it has 24 regional offices across India. The director general of the agency is appointed by the Appointments Committee of the Cabinet. The director general advises the central government in the formulation of foreign trade policy and implements it. Lav Agarwal is the current director general of DGFT.

== See also ==
- Directorate General of Trade Remedies
- Foreign trade of India
- Ministry of Commerce and Industry (India)
- Economy of India
