= Negotiable Instruments Act, 1881 =

Legislative act in India

Imperial Legislative Council
- Long title: An Act to define and amend the law relating to negotiable instruments which are Promissory Notes, Bills of Exchange and cheques.
- Citation: Act No. 26 of 1881
- Territorial extent: British India (1881–1947); India (1947-present)
- Enacted by: Imperial Legislative Council
- Enacted: 9 December 1881
- Commenced: 1 March 1882

Codification
- Code sections created: 148
- Committee report: Third Law Commission
- Status: In force (amended)

The Negotiable Instruments Act, 1881 is an act in India dating from the British colonial rule, that is still in force with significant amendments recently. It deals with the law governing the usage of negotiable instruments in India. The word "negotiable" means transferable and an "instrument" is a document giving legal effect by the virtue of the law

== History ==
The history of the present Act is a long one. The Act was originally drafted in 1866 by the 3rd Indian Law Commission and introduced in December 1867 in the council and it was referred to a Select Committee. Objections were raised by the mercantile community to the numerous deviations from the English Law in which it contained. The Bill had to be redrafted in 1877. After the lapse of a sufficient period for criticism by the Local Governments, the High Courts and the chambers of commerce, the Bill was revised by a Select Committee. In spite of this Bill could not reach the final stage. In 1880 by the Order of the Secretary of State, the Bill had to be referred to a new Law Commission. On the recommendation of the new Law Commission, the Bill was re-drafted and again it was sent to a Select Committee which adopted most of the additions recommended by the new Law Commission. The draft thus prepared for the fourth time was introduced in the council and was passed into law in 1881 being the Negotiable Instruments Act, 1881 (Act No.26 of 1881).

The most important class of Credit Instruments that evolved in India were termed Hundi. Their use was most widespread in the twelfth century and has continued till today. In a sense, they represent the oldest surviving form of credit instrument. These were used in trade and credit transactions; they were used as remittance instruments for the purpose of transfer of funds from one place to another. In Modern era Hundi served as traveller's cheques.

According to Section 13 of the Negotiable Instruments Act, "A negotiable instrument means a promissory note, bill of exchange or cheque payable either to order or to bearer." But in Section 1, it is also described the Local extent, Saving of usage relating to hundis, etc. and Commencement. It extends to the whole of India but nothing herein contained affects the Indian Paper Currency Act, 1871, Section 21, or affects any local usage relating to any instrument in an oriental language. Provided that such usages may be excluded by any words in the body of the instrument, which indicate an intention that the legal relations of the parties thereto shall be governed by this Act; and it shall come.

Main Types of Negotiable Instruments are:

1. Inland Instruments
2. Foreign Instruments
3. Bank
4. Finance Companies (listed) Draft

=== Types of negotiable instruments recognised and governed by the Act ===
- Promissory note
- Bill of exchange
- Cheque

== Structure ==
The Act comprises 148 sections classified into 17 chapters and they are as follows:

Table of Structure
Chapter	Sections	Contents
Chapter I	Sections 1 – 3	Preliminary
Chapter II	Sections 4 – 25	Notes, Bills and Cheques
Chapter III	Sections 26 – 45A	Parties to Notes, Bills and Cheques
Chapter IV	Sections 46 – 60	Negotiation
Chapter V	Sections 61 – 77	Presentment
Chapter VI	Sections 78 – 81	Payment and Interest
Chapter VII	Sections 82 – 90	Discharge from Liability of Notes, Bills and Cheques
Chapter VIII	Sections 91 – 98	Notice of Dishonour
Chapter IX	Sections 99 – 104A	Noting and Protest
Chapter X	Sections 105 – 107	Reasonable Time
Chapter XI	Sections 108 – 116)	Acceptance and Payment for Honour and Reference in Case of Need
Chapter XII	Section 117	Compensation
Chapter XIII	Sections 118 – 122	Special Rules of Evidence
Chapter XIV	Sections 123 – 131A	Crossed Cheques
Chapter XV	Sections 132 – 133	Bill in Sets
Chapter XVI	Sections 134 – 137	International Law
Chapter XVII	Sections 138 – 148	Penalties in Case of Dishonour of Certain Cheques for Insufficiency of Funds in the Accounts

== Recent legislation ==
We prefer to carry a small piece of paper known as cheque rather than carrying the currency worth the cheque's value. Before 1988 there was no provision to restrain a person issuing the a cheque without having sufficient funds in their account, although for a dishonoured cheque a civil liability would accrue. In order to ensure promptitude and remedy against the defaulters of the Negotiable Instrument a criminal remedy of penalty was inserted in Negotiable Instruments Act, 1881 by amending it with Banking, Public Financial Institutions and Negotiable Instruments Laws (Amendment) Act, 1988 (insertion of chapter XVII).

With the insertion of these provisions in the Act the situation has improved and the instances of dishonour have relatively come down but on account of application of different interpretative techniques by different High Courts on different provisions of the Act it further compounded and complicated the situation although on dishonour of cheques the trends of the verdicts of the Supreme Court of India.

Parliament enacted the Negotiable Instruments (Amendment and Miscellaneous Provisions) Act, 2002 (55 of 2002), which is intended to plug the loopholes. This amendment Act inserts five new sections from 143 to 147 touching various limbs of the parent Act and Cheque truncation through digitally were also included and the amendment Act was into force on 6 February 2003.

== Review and Reform ==
In June 2020, the Finance Ministry in the Government of India proposed the decriminalisation of a number of white-collar crimes, including cheque bouncing under Section 138 of the Negotiable Instruments Act, in order to improve the ease of doing business as well as to reduce imprisonment rates. The proposal has been opposed by a number of trade and business associations, including the Confederation of All-India Traders (CAIT), the Indian Banks' Association and Finance Industry Development Council (FIDC), and the Federation of Industrial and Commercial Organisation (FICO).
