= Lav Agarwal =

Indian Administrative Service officer

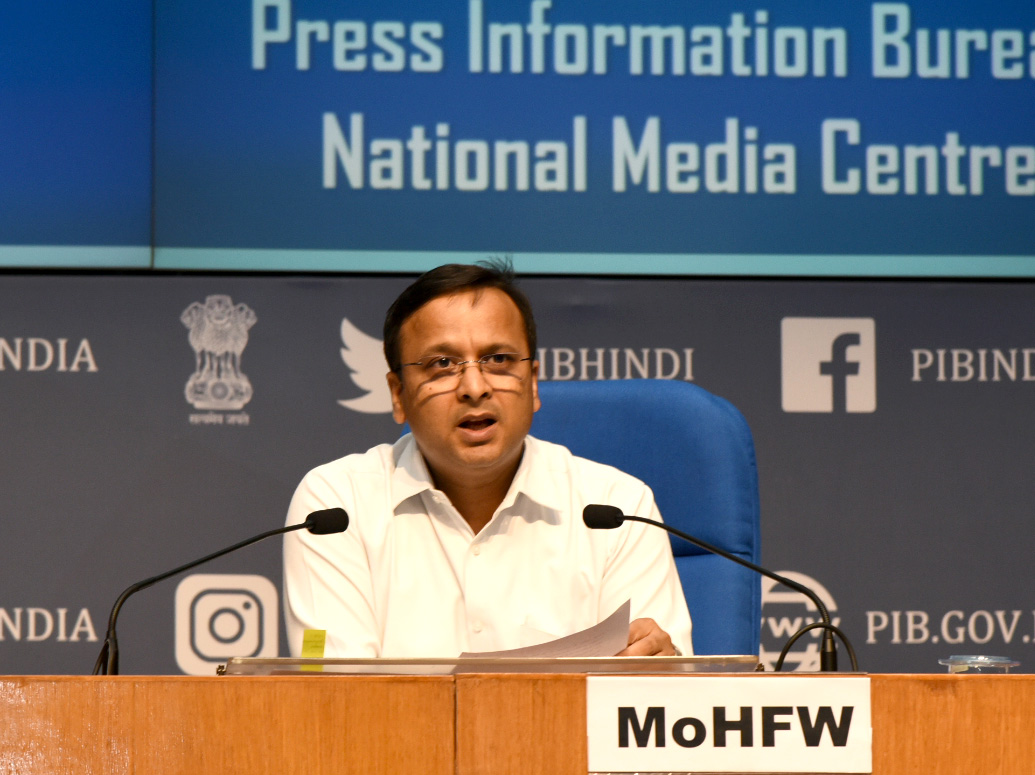

Additional Secretary of Ministry of Women and Child Development
- Incumbent
- Assumed office 5 August 2025
- Appointed by: Appointments Committee of the Cabinet

Joint Secretary of Ministry of Health and Family Welfare
- In office 28 August 2016 – August 2022
- Appointed by: Appointments Committee of the Cabinet

Personal details
- Born: 18 February 1972 (age 54) Saharanpur, Uttar Pradesh, India
- Education: (B.Tech) IIT Delhi
- Occupation: IAS officer, Civil Servant, Bureaucrat
- Known for: IAS officer leading India's media response to the 2020 coronavirus pandemic.

Lav Agarwal (born 18 February 1972) is an Indian Administrative Service officer of 1996 batch from Andhra Pradesh cadre who currently serves as the Additional Secretary of Women and Child Ministry of India and previously served as Joint Secretary in Health Ministry of India from August 2016 to August 2022. Before his appointment in Central Government, Agarwal served in various posts of Andhra Pradesh State Government.

== Early life and education ==
Lav Agarwal was born on 18 February 1972 in Saharanpur, Uttar Pradesh. He completed his Bachelor of Technology degree in Mechanical engineering from the Indian Institute of Technology Delhi. His father is a Chartered Accountant and has practiced it for 45 years in Saharanpur.

== Civil Service Career ==
After graduation Agarwal decided to appear for Civil Service Examination. And in 1996 on his third attempt he cleared UPSC Civil Services Examination with an All India Rank (AIR) of 21.

He was allotted with the Andhra Pradesh cadre, where Agarwal spent several years in Hyderabad and other districts of the state, serving in different capacities, especially in the health and education department, before coming to Delhi on central deputation in 2016 to serve as Joint Secretary in Ministry of Health and Family Welfare of Government of India from August 2016 to August 2022.

While serving as the Joint Secretary in Ministry of Health and Family Welfare his tenure coincided with COVID-19 during which he was regarded as the face of Government of India's fight against COVID-19 due to his media briefings before the Press Information Bureau in the National Media Centre on a daily basis. On 24 August 2020, Agarwal recovered from COVID-19 after being diagnosed with the same on 14 August 2020.

On August 2022 after serving for 6 years as Joint Secretary in Ministry of Health and Family Welfare he stepped down from the post and served as the resident commissner of Andhra Pradesh Bhavan in New Delhi.

In August 2025 Central Government appointed him as the Additional Secretary in Ministry of Women and Child Development of Government of India.
