= Brand India =

Brand India is a phrase used to describe the campaign India is using to attract business. Basically the campaign is to project the attractiveness of India as an emerging destination for business in the fields of service sector, manufacturing, information technology, infrastructure, information technology enabled services, etc. The campaign uses both India as market for products and services as well as a destination for investment. The federal government is spearheading the campaign.

Amongst the leading organizations working on building Brand India is India Brand Equity Foundation (IBEF), an initiative of the Ministry of Commerce and Industry, Government of India. It aims to effectively present the India business perspective and leverage business partnerships in a globalising marketplace. IBEF regularly tracks government announcements in policy, foreign investment, macroeconomic indicators and business trends.

== See also ==
- Make in India
- My Gov (India)
- Act East policy
- Digital India
- India Inc

Books

- Mongia, Sunanda. Brand India. ISBN 81-7646-469-4
- Rangnekar, Sharif D. Realizing Brand India: The Changing Face of Contemporary India. ISBN 81-291-0610-8

News

- Brand India: Now shining everywhere by Aparna Ramalingam (timesofindia.com)
