= Enquerentes =

Parish of Galicia, Spain

- Parish
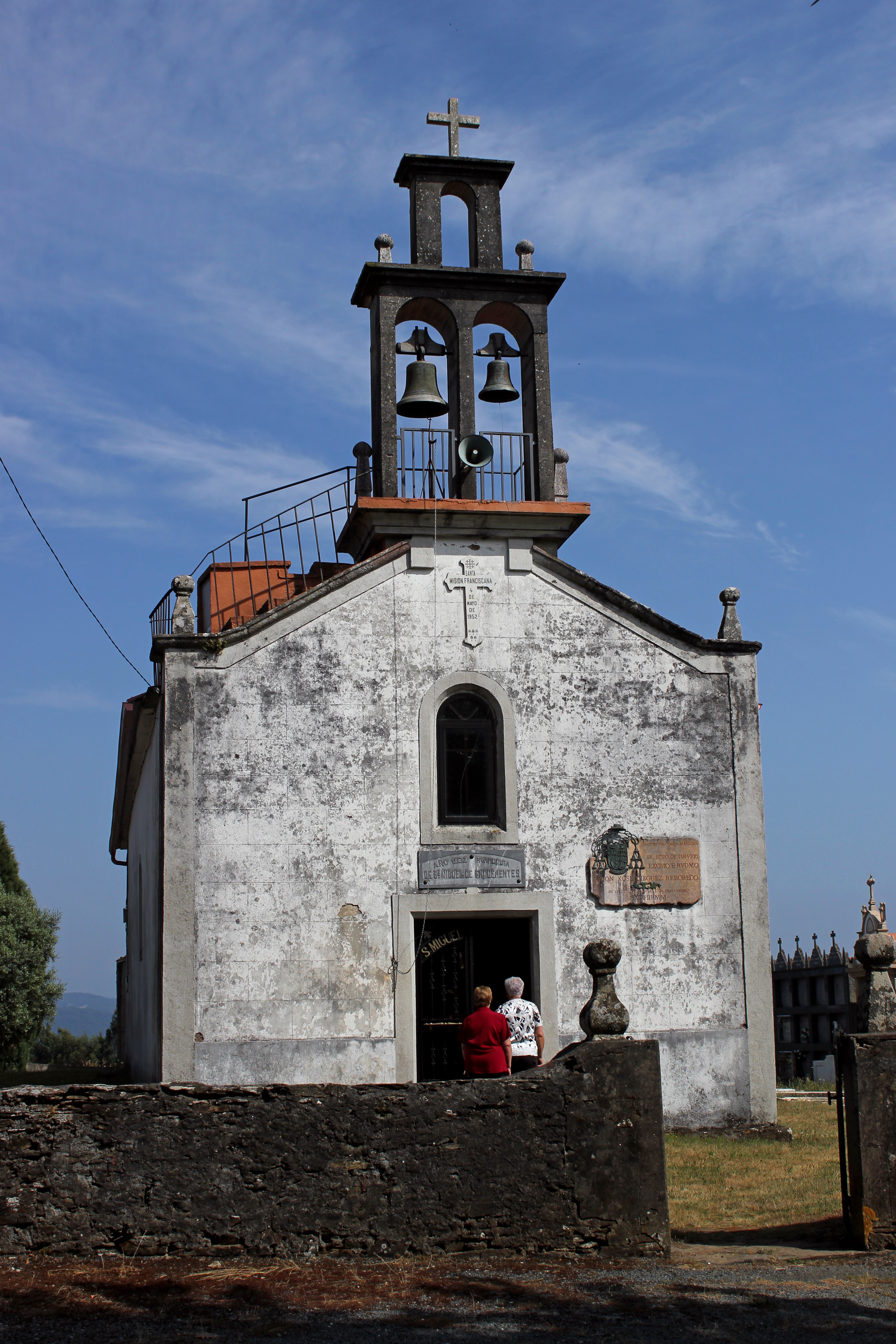

- Location of Enquerentes Enquerentes (Spain)
- Coordinates: 42°50′50″N 8°21′35″W
- Country: Spain
- Autonomous community: Galicia
- Province: Ourense
- Municipality: Touro

Population (2019)
  - Total: 51
- Time zone: UTC+1 (CET)
  - Summer (DST): UTC+2 (CEST)

Enquerentes, known officially as San Miguel de Enquerentes, is a parish (parroquia) in the municipality (concello) of Touro in the province of Ourense, in the autonomous community of Galicia, Spain.

== Population entity ==
Quintas (As Quintas) is the only population entity in Enquerentes that is part of the parish.

== Notable people ==
Enquerentes is the birthplace of Catholic prelate José Diéguez Reboredo.
