= José Diéguez Reboredo =

Roman Catholic prelate (1934–2022)

- Bishop Emertus of Tui-Vigo
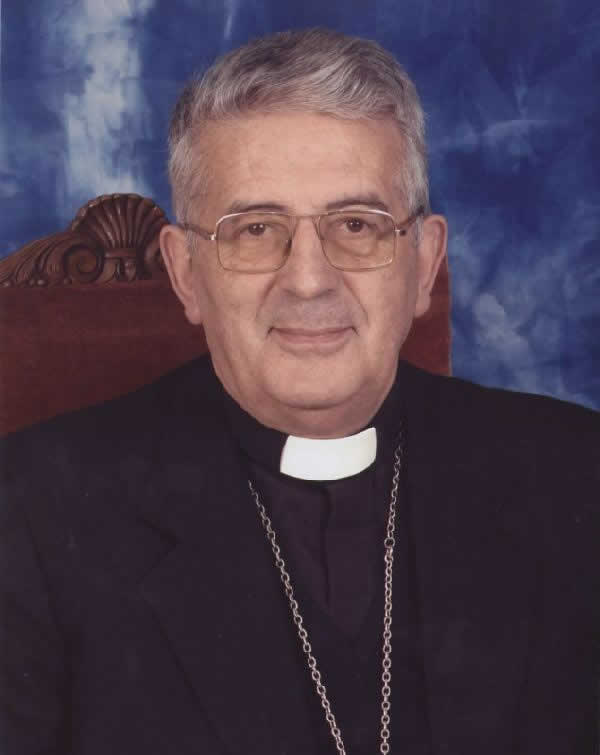
- Appointed: 7 June 1996
- Term ended: 28 January 2010
- Predecessor: José Cerviño Cerviño
- Successor: Luis Quinteiro Fiuza
- Previous posts: Bishop of Ourense (1987–1996); Bishop of Osma-Soria (1984–1987)

Orders
- Ordination: 13 August 1961
- Consecration: 28 October 1984 by Antonio Innocenti

Personal details
- Born: 25 April 1934 Enquerentes, Touro, Spain
- Died: 18 July 2022 (aged 88) Santiago de Compostela, Spain
- Motto: IN NOMINE DOMINI
- Coat of arms

Styles of José Diéguez Reboredo
- Reference style: His Excellency; The Most Reverend
- Spoken style: Your Excellency
- Religious style: Bishop

José Diéguez Reboredo (25 April 1934 – 18 July 2022) was a Spanish Roman Catholic priest who served as bishop of Osma-Soria (1984–1987), Ourense (1987–1996) and Tui-Vigo (1996–2010).

== Biography ==
Diéguez studied at the Seminary of Santiago de Compostela and in Salamanca. He graduated in exact sciences from the University of Santiago de Compostela and was a professor of mathematics at the Minor Seminary of Compostela. He was also Bishop of Osma-Soria (1984–1987) and Orense (1987–1996).

On 7 June 1996, he took over the diocese of Tuy-Vigo. In April 2009 he submitted to the Pope his resignation for having turned seventy-five years of age, a resignation that was accepted on 28 January 2010.

Diéguez died in the early afternoon of 18 July 2022, in Santiago de Compostela, where he was chaplain of the Little Sisters of the Forsaken Elderly. A few days earlier he had suffered a stroke for which he had been hospitalized.

Catholic Church titles
Preceded by José Cerviño Cerviño	Bishop of Tui-Vigo; 1996–2010	Succeeded by Luis Quinteiro Fiuza
Preceded by Ángel Temiño Sáiz	Bishop of Ourense; 1987–1996	Succeeded by Carlos Osoro Sierra
Preceded by Teodoro Cardenal Fernández	Bishop of Osma-Soria; 1984–1987	Succeeded by Braulio Rodríguez Plaza
