= Made in India (1996 TV series) =

Made in India was a weekly music programme on Channel V from 1996, specializing in Indipop. The theme song was sung by Alisha Chinai taken from her album of the same name.
