= Pramod Bhasin =

Indian businessman

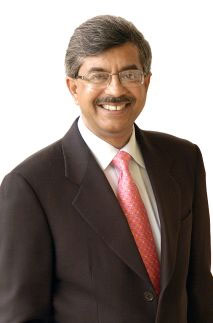
- Pramod Bhasi
- Born: Simdega,India
- Education: (BCom) Shri Ram College of Commerce (MBA) Faculty of Management Studies – University of Delhi Delhi University
- Occupation: Businessman
- Organisation: Genpact

Pramod Bhasin is an Indian Businessman and Executive who is founder and former president and CEO of Genpact one of the largest IT and software consultancy company. In 2011 he was appointed as non-executive Vice Chairman of Genpact.

== Education ==
Pramod Bhasin completed his undergraduation in BCom from Shri Ram College of Commerce and his MBA from Faculty of Management Studies – University of Delhi, (popularly known as FMS Delhi). He completed his Indian School Certificate (ISC, equivalent to the then English GCE O Levels) at Cathedral and John Connon School, Bombay (now Mumbai), in Class of 1967. As of 2016, he lives in New Delhi.

== Career ==
Pramod is a British Chartered Accountant from McLintock & Co, London, and holds a Bachelor of Commerce degree from Shri Ram College of Commerce.

He became an officer of GE. His career with GE and RCA spanned 25 years across the US, Europe and Asia. He was the head of GE Capital in India and in Asia, having earlier worked with GE Capital's Corporate and Finance Group in Stamford, Connecticut, US.

Pramod started GE Capital International Services (GECIS) in 1997 as the in-house BPO division of General Electric (GE) when he convinced the senior stakeholders at GE to outsource certain simple non-IT services to India at Gurgaon. Under Pramod GE hired Raman Roy, pioneered business process outsourcing in India, and expanded its operations from India to countries including China, Hungary, Guatemala, Poland, Mexico, Morocco, the Philippines, Romania, South Africa and the United States.

In 2007, the International Quality and Productivity Center at the Shared Services and Outsourcing Global Conclave named Genpact the Global Shared Services Leader of the Year and awarded Pramod Bhasin their Lifetime Contribution Award.

A consultant and advisor in the domain, Pramod Bhasin served as the Chairman of India's National Association of Software & Services Companies (NASSCOM) for the year 2009-10, and became a member of the Board of Trustees of NASSCOM Foundation. He is also currently serving as President at TiE Delhi-NCR.

Pramod Bhasin appointed as chairman of ICRIER (Indian Council For Research On International Economic Relations).

== Trivia and external links ==
- India's BPO emperor - Financial Express |newspaper, 29 July 2006
- Interview with Pramod on Rediff.com
