= List of Indian states and union territories by exports =

The article lists the states and union territories of India by exports of goods and exports of services. Each state's exports are listed in nominal US dollar values.

== List by goods exports ==
States and territories by goods exports between April 2022 and March 2023.

| Rank | State or Union Territory | Exports in million US$ | Share of total exports | Leading export good | Year |
|---|---|---|---|---|---|
| 1 | Gujarat | 146,485 | 33.55% | Petroleum products | 2022/23 |
| 2 | Maharashtra | 72,498 | 16.60% | Engineering goods | 2022/23 |
| 3 | Tamil Nadu | 40,673 | 9.32% | Engineering goods | 2022/23 |
| 4 | Karnataka | 27,884 | 6.39% | Petroleum products | 2022/23 |
| 5 | Uttar Pradesh | 21,686 | 4.97% | Electronic goods | 2022/23 |
| 6 | Andhra Pradesh | 19,843 | 4.54% | Engineering goods | 2022/23 |
| 7 | Haryana | 15,913 | 3.64% | Engineering goods | 2022/23 |
| 8 | West Bengal | 12,779 | 2.93% | Engineering goods | 2022/23 |
| 9 | Telangana | 11,412 | 2.61% | Drugs and pharmaceuticals | 2022/23 |
| 10 | Odisha | 11,223 | 2.57% | Engineering goods | 2022/23 |
| 11 | Rajasthan | 9,711 | 2.22% | Engineering goods | 2022/23 |
| 12 | Madhya Pradesh | 8,218 | 1.88% | Engineering goods | 2022/23 |
| 13 | Delhi | 8,170 | 1.87% | Engineering goods | 2022/23 |
| 14 | Punjab | 6,598 | 1.51% | Engineering goods | 2022/23 |
| 15 | Dadra and Nagar Haveli and Daman and Diu | 4,552 | 1.04% | Engineering goods | 2022/23 |
| 16 | Kerala | 4,375 | 1.00% | Marine products | 2022/23 |
| 17 | Chhattisgarh | 2,675 | 0.61% | Engineering goods | 2022/23 |
| 18 | Bihar | 2,611 | 0.60% | Petroleum products | 2022/23 |
| 19 | Goa | 2,454 | 0.56% | Drugs and pharmaceuticals | 2022/23 |
| 20 | Himachal Pradesh | 2,191 | 0.50% | Drugs and pharmaceuticals | 2022/23 |
| 21 | Uttarakhand | 1,782 | 0.41% | Engineering goods | 2022/23 |
| 22 | Jharkhand | 1,398 | 0.32% | Engineering goods | 2022/23 |
| 23 | Puducherry | 518 | 0.12% | Engineering goods | 2022/23 |
| 24 | Assam | 497 | 0.11% | Tea | 2022/23 |
| 25 | Jammu and Kashmir | 213 | 0.05% | Drugs and pharmaceuticals | 2022/23 |
| 26 | Chandigarh | 136 | 0.03% | Engineering goods | 2022/23 |
| 27 | Andaman and Nicobar Islands | 59 | 0.01% | Engineering goods | 2022/23 |
| 28 | Sikkim | 19 | 0.00% | Drugs and pharmaceuticals | 2022/23 |
| 29 | Tripura | 15 | 0.00% | Engineering goods | 2022/23 |
| 30 | Meghalaya | 10 | 0.00% | Others | 2022/23 |
| 31 | Arunachal Pradesh | 5 | 0.00% | Engineering goods | 2022/23 |
| 32 | Nagaland | 1 | 0.00% | Engineering goods | 2022/23 |
| 33 | Manipur | 0.68 | 0.00% | Engineering goods | 2022/23 |
| 34 | Mizoram | 0.04 | 0.00% | Others | 2022/23 |
| 35 | Ladakh | 0.01 | 0.00% | Others | 2022/23 |
| 36 | Lakshadweep | 0 | 0.00% | – | 2022/23 |
| – | India | 447,460 | 100% | Petroleum products | 2022/23 |

== List by service exports ==
States and territories with the highest exports of services between April 2022 and March 2023.

| Rank | State or Union Territory | Exports in billion INR₹ | Exports in billion US$ | Year |
|---|---|---|---|---|
| 1 | Karnataka | 1,464.65 | 18.7 | 2022/23 |
| 2 | Tamil Nadu | 1,101.66 | 14.0 | 2022/23 |
| 3 | Maharashtra | 1,085.17 | 13.8 | 2022/23 |
| 4 | Telangana | 949.20 | 12.1 | 2022/23 |
| 5 | Haryana | 241.53 | 3.1 | 2022/23 |
| 6 | Uttar Pradesh | 239.19 | 3.0 | 2022/23 |
| 7 | West Bengal | 149.99 | 1.9 | 2022/23 |
| 8 | Kerala | 147.06 | 1.9 | 2022/23 |
| 9 | Gujarat | 65.42 | 0.8 | 2022/23 |
| 10 | Odisha | 24.86 | 0.3 | 2022/23 |
| 11 | Chandigarh | 22.79 | 0.3 | 2022/23 |
| 12 | Madhya Pradesh | 20.55 | 0.3 | 2022/23 |
| 13 | Punjab | 15.15 | 0.2 | 2022/23 |
| 14 | Andhra Pradesh | 14.38 | 0.2 | 2022/23 |
| 15 | Rajasthan | 12.20 | 0.2 | 2022/23 |
