= India Inc. =

Commonly used term to describe the formal sector in India

India Inc. is a common term used by the Indian media to refer to the formal (comprising government and corporate) sector of the nation. It employed 7 percent of the workforce in 2000 and contributed 60 per cent of the nominal GDP of the nation. The informal sector consists of 44 million non-farm enterprises, as per a recent labour survey. The Companies Act 2013 allows a variety of formations in India's mixed economy. The Ministry of Company Affairs estimates that as of 31 October 2005, there were

Category	Non-government	Government	Total
Private companies limited by shares	628,957	612	629,569
Public companies limited by shares	78,473	724	79,197
Companies limited by guarantee	3,530	7	3,537
Companies with unlimited liability			497

There were 17,49,359 companies as on 31.03.2018. Out of those 3,47,857 were headquartered in Maharashtra, 3,17,998 were headquartered in Delhi, 1,96,724 were headquartered in West Bengal, 1,34,615 were headquartered in Tamil Nadu and 1,04,847 were headquartered in Karnataka. The number of active companies out of those total of 17,49,359 companies was 11,67,858

According to Annual report as of 31.03.2018, a total of 11,67,858 active companies were on the Register (consisting of 10,88,657 private limited companies and 71,288 public limited companies). Out of the above, a large number of companies were engaged in Business Services(3.56 Lakh) followed by Manufacturing (2.33 Lakh), Trading (1.52 Lakh) and Construction Trading (1.05 Lakh) sectors.

== See also ==
- Corporate America
- UK plc
- Brand India
- Make in India
- My Gov (India)
- Digital India
