= Business process outsourcing to India =

Outsourcing industry based in India

Business process outsourcing to India is the contracting of business processes to service providers or to company-owned centres in India, mainly by clients in North America and Europe. The work ranges from voice-based call centre and customer support to finance and accounting, human resources administration, procurement and analytics. Indian industry bodies group these activities as the business process management (BPM) segment of the country's technology sector.

The industry began in the mid-1990s with back-office centres opened near Gurgaon by American Express and General Electric. NASSCOM estimated BPM revenue at US$54.6 billion in the 2024–25 financial year, against total Indian technology industry revenue of US$282.6 billion. A growing share of the work is carried out in global capability centres, which clients own and operate directly.

Operations are concentrated in and around Bengaluru, Chennai, the Delhi National Capital Region, Hyderabad, Kolkata, Mumbai and Pune. The government has subsidised BPO work in smaller towns through the India BPO Promotion Scheme, which by June 2021 had created more than 40,000 jobs. Voice-based operations fall under Department of Telecommunications guidelines, which no longer require an outsourcing centre to register. The industry has been criticised for requiring call-centre staff to imitate Western speech and adopt Anglo names, and for holding political influence out of proportion to its share of the economy.

== History ==
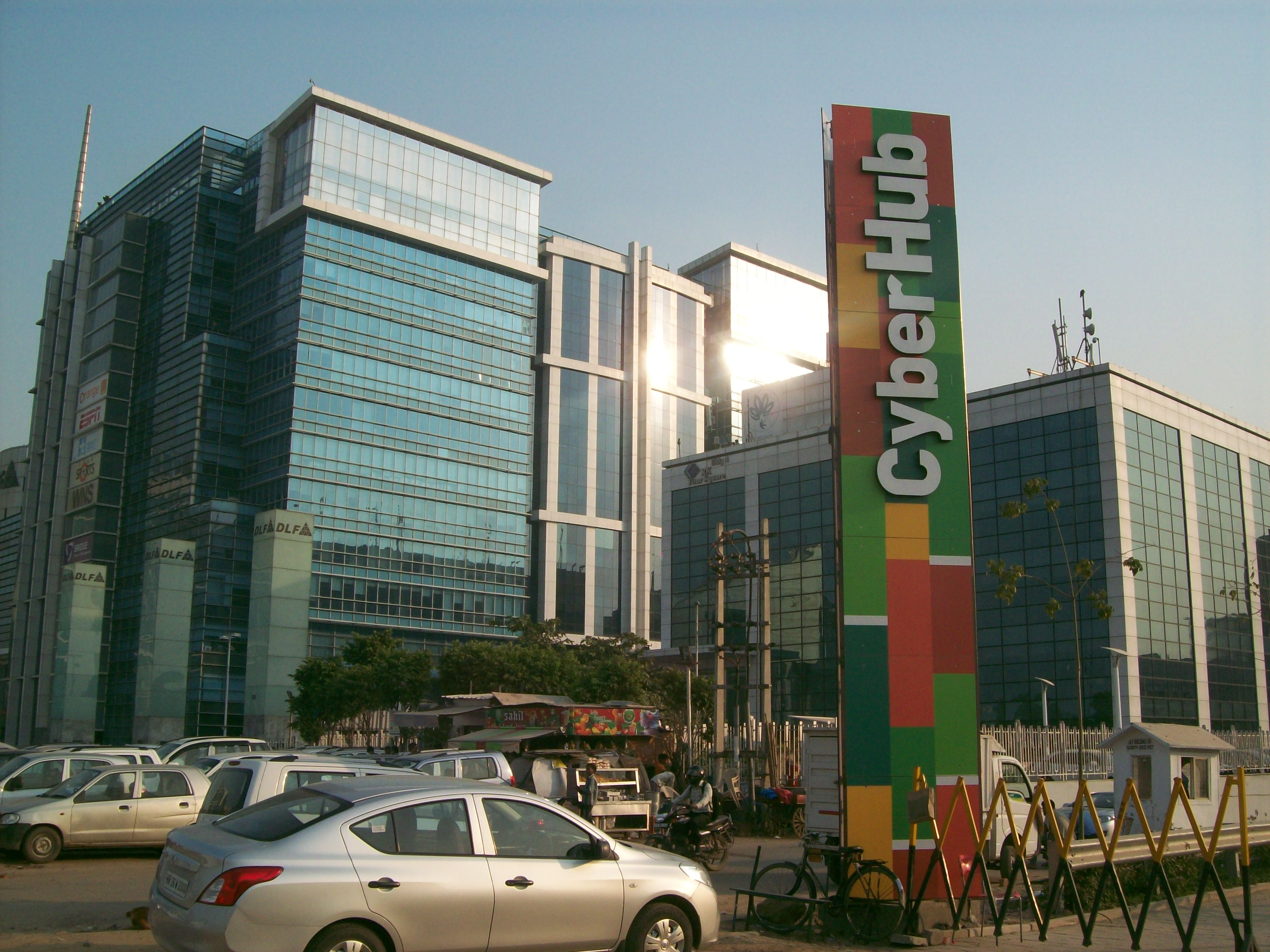
Office buildings in DLF Cyber City, Gurgaon

=== Early back-office centres ===
American Express set up a processing centre near Gurgaon in 1994 to serve its Asia-Pacific operations. Raman Roy, who had worked in the company's accounting division in India since the mid-1980s, ran the centre, which handled work for Japan, Australia and the wider Asia-Pacific region.

GE Capital International Services (Gecis) began operations in Gurgaon in 1997. It was set up by Pramod Bhasin, the head of GE Capital in India, as a captive unit for GE's own back-office work. Roy moved to GE in 1996 and extended the work from data processing into voice-based customer service.

=== Genpact ===
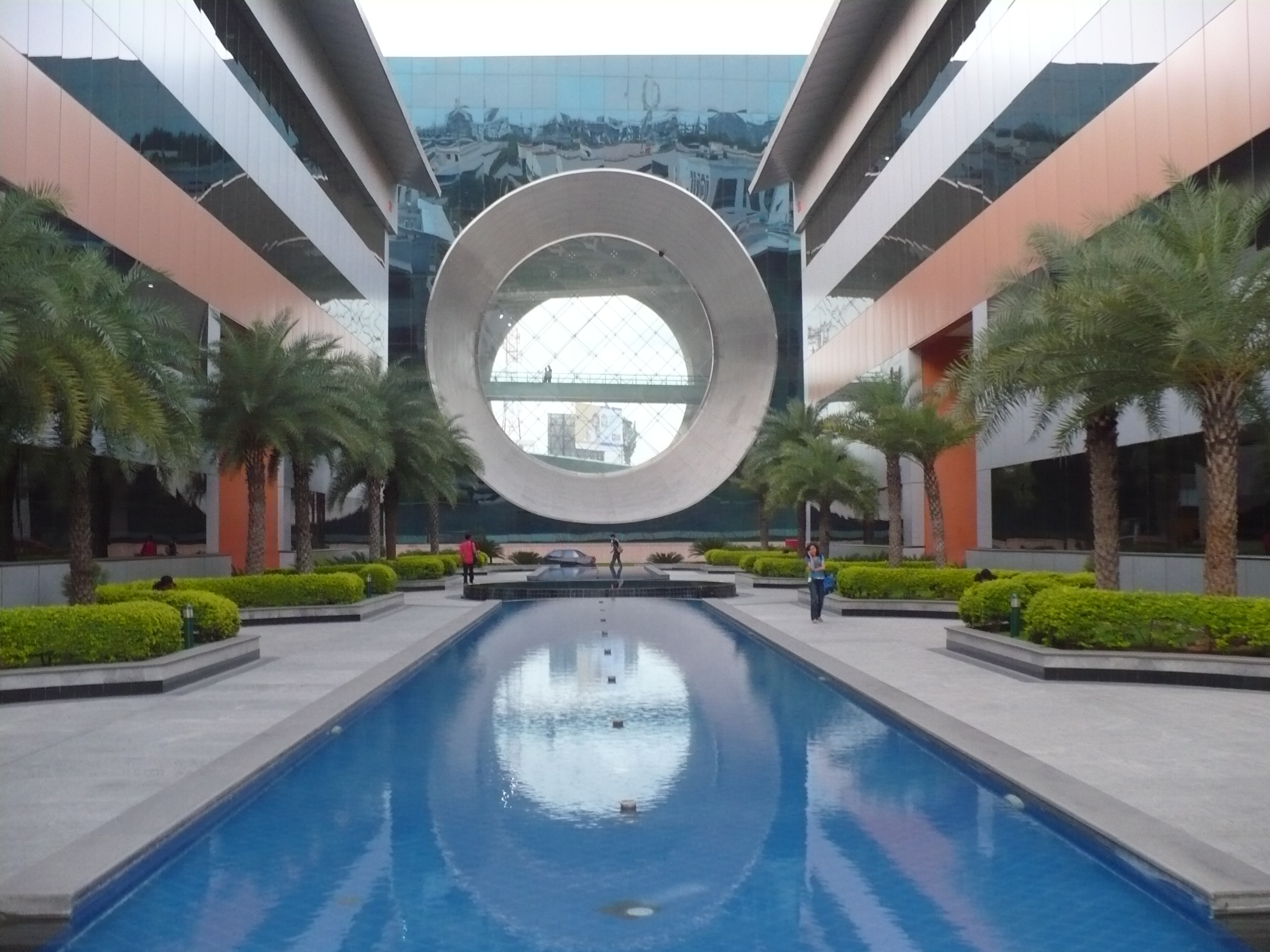
The headquarters of Infosys in Bengaluru. Its subsidiary Infosys BPM is one of the larger Indian business process providers.

On 31 December 2004, GE sold a 60% interest in Gecis to General Atlantic and Oak Hill Capital Partners for cash proceeds of about US$500 million, retaining a 40% stake. Gecis then employed more than 17,000 staff. The company was renamed Genpact in October 2005.

== Size of the industry ==
NASSCOM's Strategic Review for 2025 put BPM revenue at US$54.6 billion for the 2024–25 financial year, alongside US$137.1 billion for IT services and US$55.7 billion for engineering research and development. Total technology industry revenue was US$282.6 billion, of which exports accounted for US$224.4 billion, and the sector employed 5.8 million people.

Estimates of India's share of the global market vary with the definition used. In 2021 Software Technology Parks of India (STPI) put India's share of the global BPO industry at about 38%, and Indian BPO revenue at US$38 billion.

There are Indian companies like Infosys BPM, WNS Global Services, Datamatics Business Solutions Limited and Firstsource Solutions provided Business process outsourcing to India.

== Locations ==
Most revenue in the sector is generated in and around the metropolitan areas of Bengaluru, Chennai, the Delhi National Capital Region, Hyderabad, Kolkata, Mumbai and Pune.

Government incentives have supported operations in smaller towns. By June 2021, 252 units with 47,043 seats were operating under the India BPO Promotion Scheme across more than 100 towns in 27 states and union territories. Andhra Pradesh recorded the most jobs at 12,234, followed by Tamil Nadu with 9,401 and Punjab with 4,463. Among individual cities, Visakhapatnam led with 7,738 jobs, followed by Coimbatore with 4,908 and Mohali with 4,453. More than 30 of the locations recorded their first formal BPO or IT-enabled services operation under the scheme.

== Regulation ==
Voice-based outsourcing operations fall under the Other Service Provider (OSP) guidelines of the Department of Telecommunications. The guidelines were liberalised by an order of 5 November 2020 and replaced by revised guidelines effective 23 June 2021. The revised guidelines removed the requirement to register an OSP centre in India and abolished the distinction between domestic and international OSPs. Entities that do not carry out voice-based business process outsourcing are not regulated under the guidelines.

== Government promotion ==
The India BPO Promotion Scheme (IBPS) and the North East BPO Promotion Scheme (NEBPS) were launched by the Ministry of Electronics and Information Technology under the Digital India programme, with STPI as the implementing agency. The schemes provide up to 50% of eligible capital and operating expenditure, subject to a ceiling of ₹100,000 per seat, for BPO and ITES operations outside the main metropolitan areas.

IBPS was announced with a target of 48,300 seats. By June 2021 it had created more than 40,000 direct jobs, of which about 38% were held by women, and the ministry had raised the target to 100,000 seats. By September 2023 the scheme was reported to have generated about 50,000 jobs.

== Criticism ==
Shehzad Nadeem, a sociologist at Lehman College, argues that Indian call-centre staff are expected to imitate the Western employees they replace, adopting United States speech patterns and a temporary Anglo name for the duration of a call. He argues that this identity switching causes psychological strain, and that it has been accompanied by the adoption of Western consumer habits among workers who earn well above the national average.

Jyoti Saraswati argues that the political influence of the outsourcing industry exceeds its economic contribution, and that this has secured state support and resources for the sector ahead of parts of the economy where the developmental returns would be greater.

== See also ==
- Call centre industry in India
- Economy of India
- Foreign trade of India
- Information technology in India
- Nalini by Day, Nancy by Night – 2005 documentary on outsourcing in India
- Offshoring
