= Fragrances and Flavours Association of India =

Indian industry association

The Fragrances and Flavours Association of India (FAFAI) is a statutory body that was formed in 1948 for developing industries engaged in the manufacture of Fragrances and Flavours.

== History ==
The Fragrances and Flavours Association of India was formed as apex body in 1948 primarily aimed for the growth and development of industries engaged in manufacturing of various products relating to various Fragrances and Flavours.

As of 2023, Rishabh C Kothari is the president of the association.

== Members ==
The FAFAI covers around 1000 enterprises which operates as small, medium and large units and are considered as ancillary to Fast Moving Consumer Goods (FMCG).

== Raw material recommendation ==
The Fragrances and Flavours Association of India has prepared a list of more than 9000 ingredients the use of which are considered safe in manufacture of products related to various Fragrances and Flavours in India.

== Contribution to economy ==
The contribution of revenue from industries engaged in manufacturing of Fragrances and Flavours is estimated at around $500 million.

== Challenges ==
The industries engaged in the manufacturing of Fragrances and Flavours are facing the challenges of China due to challenges in logistics and raw material cost.

== See also ==
- Economy of India
