= History of Indian Institutes of Technology =

The Indian Institutes of Technology (IITs) are the premier autonomous public technical and research universities located across India, founded under the leadership of Jawaharlal Nehru.

== Pre-independence developments ==
The concept of the IITs originated even before India gained independence in 1947. After the end of the Second World War and before India got independence, Sir Ardeshir Dalal from the Viceroy's Executive Council foresaw that the future prosperity of India would depend not so much on capital as on technology. He, therefore, proposed the setting up of the Council of Scientific and Industrial Research. To man those laboratories, he persuaded the US government to offer hundreds of doctoral fellowships under the Technology Cooperation Mission (TCM) program. However realizing that such steps can not help in the long run for the development of India after it gains independence, he conceptualized institutes that would train such work forces in the country itself. This is believed to be the first conceptualization of IITs.

== Developments leading to the first IIT ==
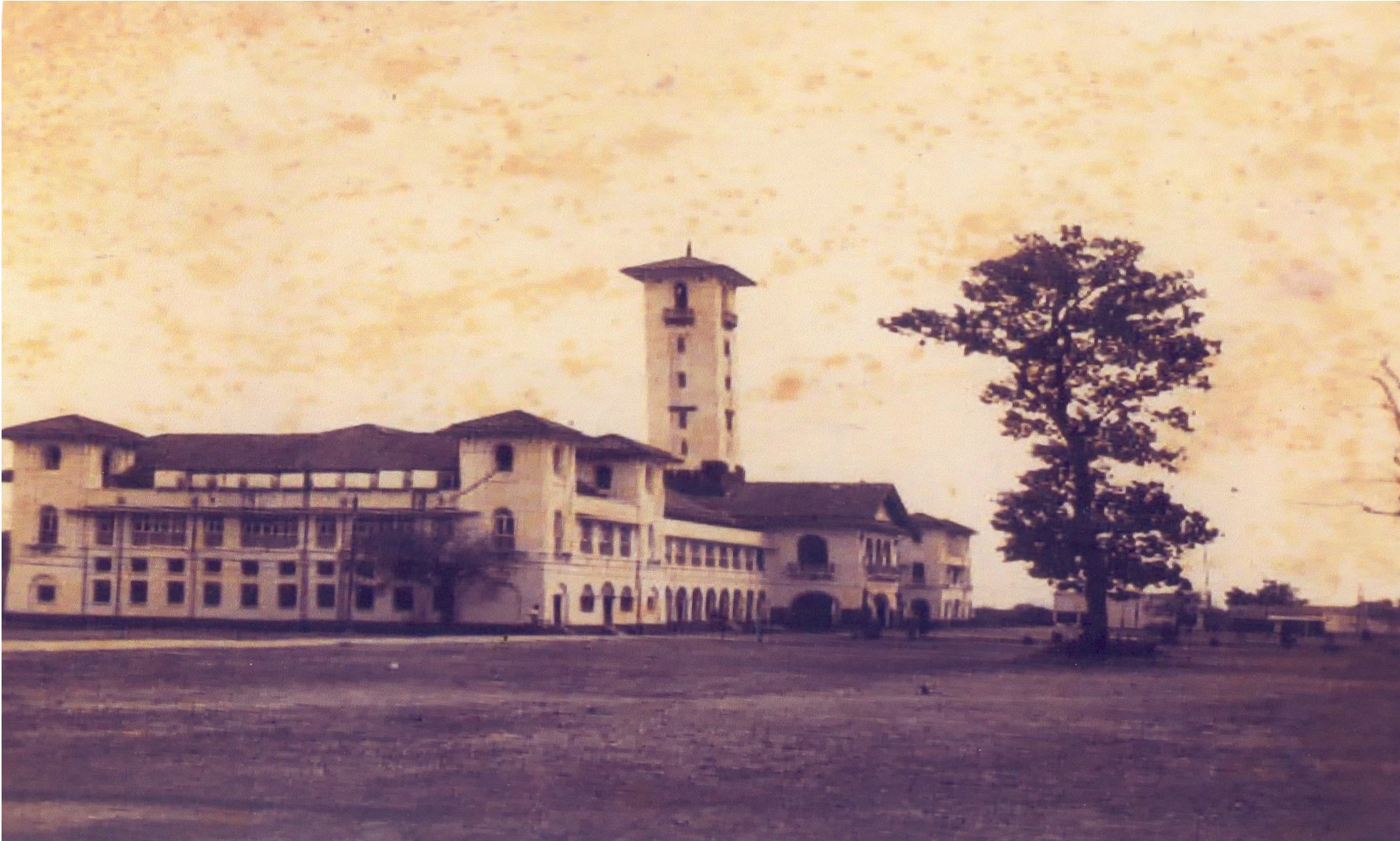
IIT Kharagpur was established at the site of the Hijli Detention Camp (pictured) in 1950.

Dr. Humayun Kabir encouraged Dr. B. C. Roy, the chief minister of West Bengal to work on Sir Ardeshir's proposal for an IIT. It is also possible that Sir J. C. Ghosh, the then director of the Indian Institute of Science, Bangalore, prompted him to do so. In 1946, Dr. Kabir along with Sir Jogendra Singh of the Viceroy's Executive Council (Department of Education, Health and Agriculture) set up a committee to prepare a proposal, and made Sir Nalini Ranjan Sarkar the chairman. The Sarkar Committee was taking too much time, but Dr. Roy did not wait for the committee to finalise its report and started working on the interim draft itself. The 22 member committee (in its interim draft) recommended the establishment of Higher Technical Institutions in the Eastern, Western, Northern and Southern regions of the country. These institutes were recommended to have a number of secondary institutions affiliated to them. The draft also urged the speedy establishment of all the four institutions with the ones in the East and the West to be started immediately. The committee also felt that such institutes should not only produce undergraduates but should be engaged in research – producing research workers and technical teachers as well. The standard of the graduates was recommended to be at par with those from elite institutions abroad. They felt that the proportion of undergraduates and postgraduate students should be 2:1.

L. S. Chandrakant and Biman Sen in the Education Ministry played significant role in producing a blueprint for a truly autonomous educational institution. Sir J. C. Ghosh (later to be the first director of IIT Kharagpur) ensured liberal provisions of the IIT Act allowing the IITs to work free from interference from the babudom. It is largely because of the IIT Act that IIT directors were granted authority superseding even some parts of the government. On the ground Bengal had the highest concentration of engineering industries, the committee suggested that an IIT may be set up in that state. This encouraged Dr. Roy. to use that fragment of a report in order to persuade Pandit Jawaharlal Nehru to push through a special Act to establish an IIT in Bengal.

With the recommendations of the Sarkar committee in view and on the basis of blueprint made by L. S. Chandrakant, Biman Sen, and Sir J. C. Ghosh, the first Indian Institute of Technology was born in May, 1950 at the site of Hijli Detention Camp in Kharagpur, a town in eastern India. Initially the IIT started functioning from 5, Esplanade East, Calcutta (now Kolkata) and shifted to Hijli in September, 1950 when Sir J. C. Ghosh offered the place as a ready made place for the IIT. The present name 'Indian Institute of Technology' was adopted before the formal inauguration of the institute on 18 August 1951, by Maulana Abul Kalam Azad. On 15 September 1956, the Parliament of India passed an act known as the Indian Institute of Technology (Kharagpur) Act declaring it as an Institute of National Importance. Jawaharlal Nehru, India's first Prime Minister, in the first convocation address of IIT Kharagpur in 1956, said:

Here in the place of that Hijli Detention Camp stands the fine monument of India, representing India's urges, India's future in the making. This picture seems to me symbolical of the changes that are coming to India."

== The next four IITs ==
To counter the criticisms of setting up IIT in West Bengal, the draft report suggested that a second IIT may be located in the Western Region to serve the process industries concentrated there. It also added that a third IIT should be considered for the North to promote the vast irrigation potential of the Gangetic basin. Not willing to leave South out (and to make it politically correct), the draft report hinted that a fourth one might be considered for the South too. However, it offered no specific economic justification for the same.

When the pressure started building up to set up IIT in the West, Jawaharlal Nehru sought Soviet assistance in order to set up the institute in Mumbai. Krishna Menon (the then Defence Minister) and closest to the Russians, got Brig. Bose appointed the first director of IIT Bombay when it got established in Powai in 1958. As a fallout of the prevailing Cold War, the Americans offered to help to set up yet another IIT. The way the Sarcar Committee had suggested, it was established in the North as IIT Kanpur (in Kanpur, Uttar Pradesh) in 1959. Dr. Kelkar was the first director of the institute.

At that time, the Germans had run up large trade surpluses, and they were persuaded to support an IIT in the South. The Germans had initially decided on Bangalore as the location, but when they visited Madras, C. Subramaniam, the education minister, took them round the governor's estate with frolicking deer roaming among hundreds of venerable banyan trees, and offered the space across the table. The visiting German team was considerably impressed by it and Madras got the fourth IIT in 1959 itself as IIT Madras.

R. N. Dogra, the ex-chief engineer of Chandigarh and the principal of Punjab Engineering College, Chandigarh, persuaded Prof M. S. Thacker, then member of the planning commission, to set up an IIT at Delhi on the ground that the country was divided into five regions, and all but the North had an IIT each. It was done on the basis of the logic that Uttar Pradesh and Madhya Pradesh constituted the Central Region. Hence, officially, Kanpur was located in the Central Region, not the North. This led to the establishment of IIT Delhi in 1961. The Indian Institutes of Technology Act was suitably amended to reflect the addition of new IITs.

== Establishment of IIT Guwahati and IIT Roorkee ==
After the establishment of IIT in Delhi, there was a long gap in any notable development in the history of IITs. However, in the beginning of the 1990s, widespread student agitations in Assam led to Prime Minister Rajiv Gandhi promising another IIT in Assam. Rajiv Gandhi agreed to it on the spot considering it a minor request of IIT although eventually it cost over Rs 1,500 crore. The IIT Guwahati campus was established in 1994 and started functioning in 1995. In the beginning of the 21st century, Dr. Murli Manohar Joshi (the Education Minister of India) made University of Roorkee into an IIT, making IIT Roorkee the newest IIT but the oldest institution amongst the seven in 2001.

== Establishment of eight new IITs ==
Establishment of the eight new IITs began with decision of the cabinet, which was announced by the Minister of Human Resource Development (MHRD), Arjun Singh, on 28 March 2008 that the government planned to establish more IITs, Indian Institutes of Management (IIMs) and Central Universities across the country. Six IITs at Bhubaneswar, Gandhinagar, Hyderabad, Jodhpur, Patna and Ropar began functional from 2008 while other two at Indore and Mandi commenced their sessions from 2009.

== Conversion of IIT (BHU) Varanasi ==
In order to establish more IITs in India, MHRD constituted Professor S K Joshi Committee in 2003 and Anand Krishnan Committee in 2005 to recommend names of existing institutes that had the potential of being converted into an IIT institute, both of which had recommended for the conversion of the IT-BHU into an Indian Institute of Technology (IIT). On 17 July 2008, the government of India issued a press release granting "In principle approval for taking over the Institute of Technology, Banaras Hindu University – a constituent unit of the Banaras Hindu University, a Central University, its conversion into an Indian Institute of Technology and integrating it with the IIT system in the country." After the approval of BHU Executive Council, a bill was introduced on 4 August 2010, a bill seeking to amend the Institutes of Technology Act 1961 to declare IT-BHU as an IIT. The Bill was eventually signed by the president of India on 20 June 2012 and notified in the gazette on 21 June. The Central Government released a notification on 29 June that as per the Act, the transformation process was complete and the erstwhile IT-BHU was renamed as Indian Institute of Technology (BHU) Varanasi.

== Conversion of IIT (ISM) Dhanbad and establishment of six new IITs ==
The proposal for conversion of ISM Dhanbad into an IIT had been strongly recommended in 1994 by a Government Committee, headed by Prof. S. Sampath (former Director of IIT Kanpur and IIT Madras). However, no action was taken by the Government over the proposal.

Several years later, in 2007–08, several new Indian Institutes of Technology (IITs) like IIT Patna were set up without even having a campus, while ISM was not converted into IIT. This was despite the fact that since 1997, ISM was taking in IIT-JEE qualified students (along with the 7 older IIT's and IT-BHU). After the conversion of IT-BHU to IIT-BHU in June 2012, ISM was the only non-IIT institute which admitted IIT-JEE (now called JEE-Advanced) qualified students to its various undergraduate and dual degree programmes. Once admitted into ISM or an IIT through IIT-JEE (JEE-Advanced) exam, a student was not permitted to appear in the exam again, and hence could not take admission in an IIT next year (as per rules of the JEE-Advanced exam). In this respect, Govt of India treated ISM at par with IITs.

In 2009, ISM got the approval of its finance committee, executive board and general council, proposing its conversion to an IIT. This was forwarded to Ministry of Human Resource and Development (MHRD), Government of India in early 2010. This was followed by a detailed project report on the conversion prepared by EdCIL (a public sector enterprise), on the directions of the HRD Ministry. The ISM Teachers Association and ISM Alumni Association passed resolutions in 2010–11, favoring this conversion. In September 2011, a resolution was passed by the Government of Jharkhand, recommending to the Government of India to convert ISM to an IIT soon.

On 7 May 2012, the director of ISM gave a detailed presentation highlighting the various aspects of institute and the need for its conversion to an IIT, at the Yojana Bhawan, Planning commission. The meeting was chaired by Narendra Jadhav, Member of MHRD. The conclusion that came to be was inclusion of the conversion in the 12th Five Year Plan (2012–17).

In June 2012, a planning commission panel, on a reference to it from the Union Cabinet, favoured that this conversion be done, during the 12th Five Year Plan (2012–2017) and in such a possible way that ISM's core competency in mining and geology is maintained.

The proposal to convert ISM to IIT became a part of the 12th Five Year Plan after its passage by the prime minister headed National Development Council or NDC, on 27 December 2012. ISM was the only institute of India selected by NDC to be converted into an IIT in the 12th Five Year Plan.

Finally, the Union Finance Minister Mr. Arun Jaitley, during his budget speech in Parliament on 28 February 2015, had proposed to upgrade ISM Dhanbad into an Indian Institute of Technology (IIT). On 25 May 2016, the Union Cabinet headed by Prime Minister Modi approved that a bill be introduced in Parliament for converting ISM Dhanbad into an IIT.

On 25 May 2016, the Union Cabinet passed a draft bill proposed to set up 6 new IITs and convert ISM Dhanbad into a full-fledged IIT. On 19 July 2016 the said Bill, named The Institutes of Technology (Amendment) Bill, 2016 was introduced in the Lok Sabha. On 25 July 2016, the mentioned Bill was passed without any opposition by the Lok Sabha.. On 2 August 2016, the IIT Amendment Bill 2016 (for conversion of ISM Dhanbad to IIT (ISM) Dhanbad and including setting up of 6 new IITs at Bhilai, Dharwad, Goa, Jammu, Palakkad and Tirupati) was passed by Rajya Sabha.

The Bill was eventually signed by the president of India on 10 August and notified in the Gazette of India and ISM Dhanbad was renamed as Indian Institute of Technology (ISM), Dhanbad.
