= Inter IIT Sports Meet =

Inter-college sports meet

Tournament information
- Sport: 14 different Inter collegiate sports
- Location: India
- Established: 1961
- Administrator: Indian Institutes of Technology
- Participants: 3500 athletes
- Website: Official Website

Current champion
- IIT Madras (2025)

Inter IIT Sports Meet is the annual sports tournament of the Indian Institutes of Technology. It is organized in December, with the Aquatics events held separately in October. It is the longest-running Inter-collegiate meet where all IITs participate, having been held since 1961. In 2024, the event was held at IIT Kanpur and IIT Indore jointly and for 2025, it was held at IIT Hyderabad, IIT Madras and IIT Tirupati.

== Sports and participating institutes ==
Tournaments are held in 15 different sports, namely:

1. Athletics
2. Badminton
3. Basketball
4. Cricket
5. Chess
6. Kho kho
7. Football
8. Hockey
9. Lawn tennis
10. Squash
11. Swimming
12. Table tennis
13. Volleyball
14. Water polo
15. Weightlifting

All the 23 IITs participating in the Inter-IIT Sports Meet:

1. Indian Institute of Technology Bhilai
2. Indian Institute of Technology Bhubaneshwar
3. Indian Institute of Technology (BHU) Varanasi
4. Indian Institute of Technology Bombay
5. Indian Institute of Technology Delhi
6. Indian Institute of Technology (Indian School of Mines) Dhanbad
7. Indian Institute of Technology Dharwad
8. Indian Institute of Technology Gandhinagar
9. Indian Institute of Technology Goa
10. Indian Institute of Technology Guwahati
11. Indian Institute of Technology Hyderabad
12. Indian Institute of Technology Indore
13. Indian Institute of Technology Jammu
14. Indian Institute of Technology Jodhpur
15. Indian Institute of Technology Kanpur
16. Indian Institute of Technology Kharagpur
17. Indian Institute of Technology Madras
18. Indian Institute of Technology Mandi
19. Indian Institute of Technology Palakkad
20. Indian Institute of Technology Patna
21. Indian Institute of Technology Roorkee
22. Indian Institute of Technology Ropar
23. Indian Institute of Technology Tirupati

== History ==
The proposition for an Inter IIT Sports Meet was brought up in 1961, and IIT Bombay hosted the first ever Inter IIT Sports Meet. Only five IITs were in existence then, namely IIT Bombay, IIT Madras, IIT Kharagpur, IIT Kanpur and IIT Delhi; who competed in five sports only.

=== History and winners ===
Year	Edition	Held at	Champions	Year	Edition	Held at	Champions	Year	Edition	Held at	Champions
1961	1	Bombay	Kharagpur	1989	26	Kanpur	Kharagpur	2015	51	Madras	Cancelled due to flooding in Chennai
1963	2	Kharagpur	Kharagpur	1990	27	Delhi	Delhi	2016	51	Kanpur	Kanpur
1964	3	Madras	Kharagpur	1991	28	Kharagpur	Kharagpur	2017	52	Madras	Bombay
1966	4	Bombay	Bombay	1993	29	Bombay	Bombay	2018	53	Guwahati	Delhi
1967	5	Delhi	Kharagpur	1994	30	Madras	None - last 3 days rained out	2019	54	Kharagpur and Bhubaneswar	Kharagpur
1968	6	Kanpur	Kharagpur	1995	31	Kanpur	Bombay	2020	55	Delhi and Roorkee	Cancelled due to COVID-19 Pandemic
1969	7	Kharagpur	Kharagpur	1996	32	Delhi	Madras	2021	55	Delhi and Roorkee	Cancelled due to COVID-19 Pandemic
1970	8	Madras	Madras	1997	33	Kharagpur	Kharagpur	2022	55	Delhi and Roorkee	Roorkee
1972	9	Kharagpur	Madras	1998	34	Bombay	Bombay	2023	56	Bombay and Gandhinagar	Madras
1973	10	Bombay	Madras	1999	35	Madras	Madras	2024	57	Kanpur and Indore	Bombay
1974	11	Delhi	Madras	2000	36	Kanpur	Bombay	2025	58	Hyderabad, Madras and Tirupati	Madras
1975	12	Kharagpur	Madras	2001	37	Kharagpur	Kharagpur	2026	59	Kharagpur and Dhanbad	TBA
1976	13	Kanpur	Madras	2002	38	Delhi	Delhi				
1977	14	Madras	Madras	2003	39	Bombay	Madras				
1978	15	Bombay	Madras	2004	40	Madras	Madras				
1979	16	Delhi	Madras	2005	41	Roorkee	Kharagpur				
1980	17	Kanpur	Madras	2006	42	Guwahati	Madras				
1981	18	Kharagpur	Bombay	2007	43	Bombay	Bombay				
1982	19	Bombay	Madras	2008	44	Madras	Bombay				
1983	20	Madras	None - last 2 days rained out (Bombay was ahead)	2009	45	Kanpur	Bombay				
1984	21	Kanpur	Bombay	2010	46	Delhi	Madras				
1985	22	Delhi	Bombay	2011	47	Kharagpur	Madras				
1986	23	Kharagpur	Kharagpur	2012	48	Roorkee	Bombay				
1987	24	Bombay	Bombay	2013	49	Guwahati	Kanpur				
1988	25	Madras	Madras	2014	50	Bombay	Kanpur				

Note: Before 1978, the meet numbering was not consistent. For example, IIT Madras annual reports record the 1977 meet as the 13th and the 1975 meet as the 11th

=== IITs with most overall wins ===
IIT	First win	Last win	Wins in last 10 editions	Total wins
IIT Madras	1970	2025	2	21
IIT Bombay	1966	2024	2	15
IIT Kharagpur	1961	2019	1	13
IIT Kanpur	2013	2016	3	3
IIT Delhi	1990	2018	1	3
IIT Roorkee	2022	2022	1	1

=== Cancellations and Postponements ===
The meets of 1965 and 1971 were cancelled due to the India-Pakistan wars, while the one in 1992 was to be held at IIT Bombay but was cancelled owing to the communal riots in Mumbai. The 2015 meet that was supposed to be held at IIT Madras was washed out due to unpredictable rains. The 2020 and 2021 meets were cancelled due to COVID.

Unlike the above events which were cancelled / re-scheduled in entirety, the meets of 1983 and 1994, both hosted at IIT Madras, were abandoned after the meet started as scheduled. In both cases, heavy rains made continuation of the meet unviable and the meets were abandoned part way.

== Recent championships ==
=== 49th Inter IIT Sports Meet 2013 ===
The 49th Inter IIT Sports Meet was held at IIT Guwahati from 16 to 23 December 2013. MC Mary Kom launched her autobiography Unbreakable during the ceremony; along with former Miss Universe and Hindi film actress Sushmita Sen.

The mascot for the 49th Inter IIT was Bhaiti, a bamboo which is the first ever mascot for the annual sports meet. Inspired by the slenderness and strength of its namesake plant, Bhaiti was designed by Thomas G. Manih, a student of IIT Guwahati, under the guidance of Dr. D. Udaya Kumar, who is credited with designing the Indian Rupee sign.

IIT Kanpur emerged as the winners of the General Championship in the Men's tournament, while IIT Roorkee won the Women's General Championship.

=== 50th Inter IIT Sports Meet 2014 ===
The Golden Jubilee edition of the Inter IIT Sports Meet was hosted by IIT Bombay in October and December 2014. The Inter IIT Aquatics Meet took place during 1–4 October 2014. The Opening Ceremony of that was graced by the presence of Virdhawal Khade. The 50th Inter IIT Sports Main Meet took place during 12–19 December 2014 at the IIT Bombay campus. The Opening Ceremony of that was graced by the presence of Cricket legend Sachin Tendulkar. The institute has undertaken massive renovations of the play fields in anticipation of the meet. Sachin gave the most anticipated address of that day. The last time IIT Bombay hosted an Inter IIT Sports Meet was in 2007, as a part of the Golden Jubilee celebrations of the institute. IIT Kanpur declared as the overall champions, winners of the General Championship in the Men's tournament and second in the Women's Championship, while IIT Bombay won the Women's General Championship.

=== 51st Inter IIT Sports Meet 2016 ===
The 51st edition of the Inter IIT Sports Meet was hosted by IIT Kanpur in October and December 2016. The Opening Ceremony of that was graced by the presence of Paralympic Javelin Thrower Devendra Jhajharia, who won Gold at 2016 Rio Paralympics and is also the current World Paralympic Record Holder in Javelin Throw under F46 events. IIT Madras Aquatic Team has won the Overall Championship in the Inter-IIT Aquatic Meet held at IIT Kanpur during 2 to 5 October 2016 IIT Kanpur continued their winning spirit and emerged as overall champions for third consecutive time.

=== 52nd Inter IIT Sports Meet 2017 ===
The 52nd edition of the Inter IIT Sports Meet was hosted by IIT Madras in October and December 2017. The Inter IIT Aquatics Meet took place during October. The 52nd Inter IIT Sports Main Meet took place during 15–23 December 2017 at IIT Madras' lush green campus. The Opening Ceremony was graced by the presence of renowned Indian Field Hockey Team's former Captain Viren Rasquinha, who also is the CEO of Olympic Gold Quest (OGQ). IIT Bombay were declared the Overall Champions.

=== 53rd Inter IIT Sports Meet 2018 ===
The 53rd Inter IIT Sports Meet was hosted by IIT Guwahati. The 34th Aquatics Meet took place during 3–7 October, while the Main Meet was being hosted in December. This edition held a special significance for IIT Guwahati as it is being conducted to celebrate the silver jubilee of the institute. It was also the first time that Para-powerlifting event had been introduced.

The Aquatics Meet Opening Ceremony was graced by the presence of Sajan Prakash, the man with the highest number of National Records in short course and long course swimming events. The Chief Guest for the Main Meet's opening ceremony was Shiny Abraham, she has represented India in more than eighty international meets and was the first Indian woman to reach the semi-finals of an Olympic event. The ceremony also had Rio Paralympics gold medalist, Mariyappan Thangavelu as its guest of honor.

53rd Inter IIT sports meet was won by IIT Delhi with 106 points, 26 points clear of the runner up.

=== 54th Inter IIT Sports Meet 2019 ===
The 53rd Inter IIT Sports Meet was hosted jointly by IIT Kharagpur and IIT Bhubaneswar. The 35th Aquatics Meet took place during 29 September to 4 October, while the Main Meet was held from 14 December to 22 December.

54th Inter IIT sports meet was won by IIT Kharagpur with 123.6 points, 28.4 points clear of the runner up.

=== 55th Inter IIT Sports Meet 2022 ===
The 55th Inter IIT Sports Meet was hosted jointly by IIT Roorkee and IIT Delhi. This event was held between 14 and 22 December 2022.

IIT	Position
Roorkee	1st
Kharagpur	2nd
Delhi	3rd

=== 56th Inter IIT Sports Meet 2023 ===
IIT Gandhinagar and IIT Bombay jointly hosted the 56th Inter IIT Sports Meet. This event was held between 10 and 15 December 2023 at IIT Bombay and 15–22 December at IIT Gandhinagar. IIT Madras clinched the general championship in 2023.

=== 57th Inter IIT Sports Meet 2024 ===
IIT Indore and IIT Kanpur jointly hosted the 57th Inter IIT Sports Meet. This event was held between 10 and 19 December 2024. IIT Kanpur hosted the following sports: basketball, tennis, cricket, hockey, table tennis, and volleyball. While IIT Indore hosted aquatics, athletics, badminton, football, squash, and weightlifting.

The women's general championship was won by IIT Madras, with IIT Bombay on the second place and IIT Kharagpur, the third. The men's general championship was won by IIT Delhi, with IIT Kanpur on the second place and IIT Bombay, the third. IIT Bombay was the winner of the overall general championship in 2024.
