= Shantanu Desai =

Indian theoretical physicist and astrophysicist

- Citizenship: Indian
- Education: Indian Institute of Technology Bombay (BTech); Boston University (MA, PhD)
- Known for: Cosmology, gravitational waves, pulsar timing arrays
- Awards: 2016 Breakthrough Prize in Fundamental Physics (as part of Super-Kamiokande Collaboration)
- Scientific career
- Fields: Theoretical physics Astrophysics; Cosmology
- Workplaces: Indian Institute of Technology Hyderabad
- Website: www.iith.ac.in/phy/shantanud

Shantanu Desai is an Indian theoretical physicist and astrophysicist. He is a professor in the Department of Physics at the Indian Institute of Technology Hyderabad. His research focuses on cosmology, gravitational waves, pulsar astrophysics, and neutrino physics.

== Selected publications ==
- Desai, S. et al. (2024). Search for GeV gamma-ray emission from galaxy clusters. Journal of Cosmology and Astroparticle Physics.
- Desai, S. (2018). Constraints on graviton mass from galaxy cluster Abell 1689. Physics Letters B.
- Desai, S. et al. (2023). Classification of pulsar glitch amplitudes using extreme deconvolution. Journal of High Energy Astrophysics.
