= Indian Institute of Information Technology, Raichur =

Public university in Raichur, India

Coordinates: 16.1941528°N 77.4401099°E

Indian Institute of Information Technology Raichur
- Type: IIIT
- Established: 2019
- Parent institution: Indian Institute of Technology Hyderabad
- Director: Harish Kumar Sardana
- Students: approx. 500
- Location: Indian Institute of Information Technology Raichur, Wadavatti, Gadwal Road, Raichur, Karnataka, India
- Website: www.iiitr.ac.in

Indian Institute of Information Technology Raichur (abbreviated IIIT Raichur) is a public technical and research university located in the district of Raichur in Karnataka, India which holds the title of Institute of National Importance and is one of the most prestigious colleges in the country. The Institute is being set up with the financial contributions of Ministry of Education, Government of India and Government of Karnataka. The average package for 2025 B.Tech batch was 18 LPA.

== History ==
IIIT Raichur was established by the Ministry of Education, Government of India, in 2019 under Public-Private Partnership (PPP) Model. It was given the status of Institute of National Importance (INI) by the Government of India, under the Indian Institutes of Information Technology Laws (Amendment) Bill, 2020. The bill was passed by the Lok Sabha on 20 March 2020 and by the Rajya Sabha on 22 September 2020. IIIT Raichur began functioning on 26 July 2019 from a temporary campus at Indian Institute of Technology, Hyderabad(IIT Hyderabad), with Prof. Budaraju Srinivasa Murty as the mentor director and IIT Hyderabad as the mentor institute. Since December 2022, Prof. Harish Kumar Sardana has been serving as the founding director of the institute.

== Campus ==
IIIT Raichur is sharing the campus of Government Engineering College (GEC), Yaramarus Camp, Raichur, Karnataka. All the Academic and Curricular activities take place at GEC Campus, Raichur. The students are residing in the Hostels at GEC Campus, Raichur.

The State Government of Karnataka has handed over a land of 74 Acres for the construction of a Permanent Campus at Raichur. The institute has invited a tender for the Appointment of an Architect for a Comprehensive Architectural Design Package for the Development of a Master Plan, Academic Block, Administrative Block, Faculty & Staff Housing, Student Hostels, Sports Facilities, and Related Infrastructure for IIIT Raichur. As of September 2025, the permanent campus is expected to be completed by January, 2026 according to officials.

== Academics ==
=== Academic programs ===
IIIT Raichur offers B.Tech, B.Tech(Honors), and Ph.D programs. The institute follows a Fractal Academic System, involving continuous evaluation of students.

Originally started in 2019, the current intake of B.Tech (Computer Science and Engineering) program is 80 students.

Starting Aug 2023, the institute is offering another B.Tech program in Artificial Intelligence & Data Science with an intake of 60 students.

As of 2025, the institute has total 520 students spread across all the 4 years of B.Tech course.
