= Budaraju Srinivasa Murty =

Indian metallurgist

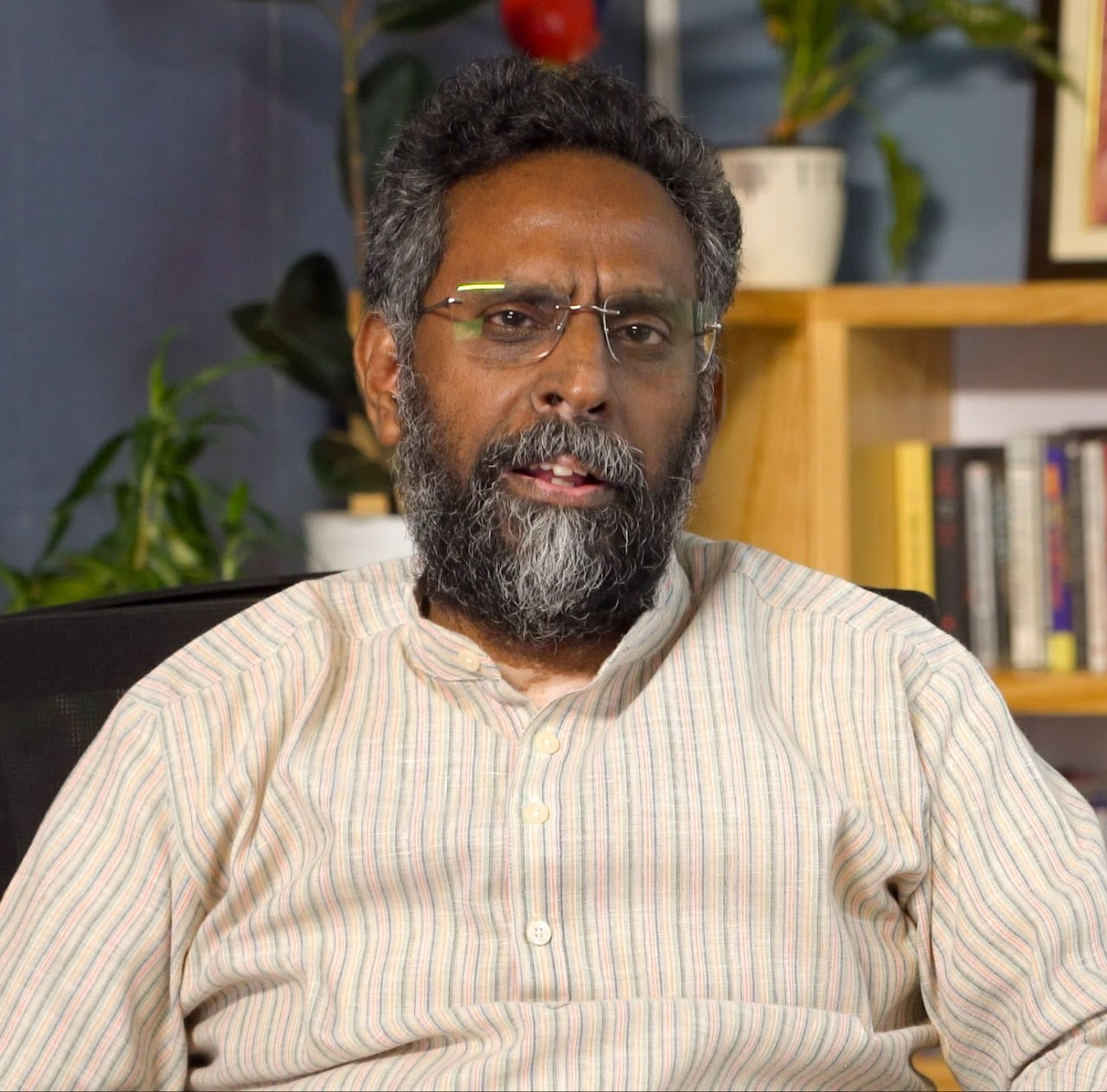

Director of IIT Hyderabad
- Incumbent
- Assumed office 26 August 2019
- Preceded by: U. B. Desai

Personal details
- Born: 13 February 1964 (age 62) Vijayawada, Andhra Pradesh, India
- Education: Indian Institute of Science, Visvesvaraya National Institute of Technology
- Known for: Materials science, Metallurgy
- Awards: Shanti Swarup Bhatnagar Prize for Science and Technology

Budaraju Srinivasa Murty (born 13 February 1964) is an Indian metallurgical engineer. He was awarded the Shanti Swarup Bhatnagar Prize for Science and Technology, the highest science award in India, for the year 2007 in engineering science category. From August 2019 he serves as the Director of Indian Institute of Technology Hyderabad. Additional charge as director of NIT Andhra Pradesh from 14 February 2024 till August 2024 and also served as additional charge as director of IIIT Raichur from January 2024 till November 2024. Prior to that he was head of department at Indian Institute of Technology Madras and professor at Indian Institute of Technology Kharagpur.

== Early life and education ==
Murty was born on 13 February 1964 in Vijayawada, India. He did his diploma in metallurgical engineering from Government Polytechnic, Vijayawada. He graduated B.Tech. in metallurgical engineering from Visvesvaraya Regional College of Engineering, Nagpur (now Visvesvaraya National Institute of Technology), in 1986 at the top of the class. He then joined Indian Institute of Science, Bangalore, for his master's degree. From there he got his Ph.D. in 1992. His PhD supervisor was Professor S. Ranganathan.

== Research ==
Murty's Ph.D. dissertation was titled "Study of Amorphous Phase Formation by Mechanical Alloying in Ti Based Systems", in which he started one of the earliest works in Mechanical alloying in India. His research interests span over nanocrystalline metals and alloys, High entropy alloys, Bulk metallic glass, quasicrystalline alloys, grain refinement and modification of Al alloys, Al-based composites, in-situ composites, non-equilibrium processing, particulate technologies, thermodynamics and kinetics of phase transformations, transmission electron microscopy and Atom-probe tomography. He has set up a National Facility for Atom Probe Tomography at IIT Madras with a remotely operable Local Electrode Atom Probe (LEAP) (first such facility globally) that can characterize materials in 3D at the atomic scale. He has also set up Deakin-IITM Centre of Excellence on Advanced Materials and Manufacturing at IIT Madras jointly with Deakin University, Australia. He has authored above 400 journal publications and 4 books. He has supervised 39 PhDs and 20 PhDs are ongoing. He has completed over 55 sponsored research projects and currently handling 13 projects and filed 20 patents.
