= Rajat Moona =

Indian professor and administrator

Director at Indian Institute of Technology Gandhinagar
- In office 3 October 2022 – present
- Preceded by: Prof.Sudhir K. Jain

Director (Additional Supervisor) at Indian Institute of Information Technology Vadodara
- In office 21 May 2023 – 30 May 2024
- Preceded by: Prof. Saraat Kumar Pathan
- Succeeded by: Prof. Dharmendra Singh

Director at Indian Institute of Technology Bhilai
- In office 20 March 2017 – 26 September 2022
- Preceded by: Position Established
- Succeeded by: Prof.Rajiv Prakash

Director General of Centre for Development of Advanced Computing
- In office 1 May 2011 – 15 March 2017
- Preceded by: Rajan Joseph
- Succeeded by: Dr. Debashish Dutta

Professor at Indian Institute of Technology Kanpur
- In office 15 April 1991 – 31 March 2030

Personal details
- Born: 28 March 1965 (age 61) Uttar Pradesh
- Education: Indian Institute of Technology Kanpur; Indian Institute of Science Bangalore
- Profession: Professor; Administrator; Consultant
- Known for: Computer Hardware and Architecture and VLSI Design
- Website: www.cse.iitk.ac.in/users/moona/

Rajat Moona (born 28 March 1965) is the Director of Indian Institute of Technology Gandhinagar from October 2022 onwards. He has also served as Director of Indian Institute of Information Technology, Vadodara on additional Charge Basis from 2023 till 2024. He has served as director at Indian Institute of Technology, Bhilai from March 2017 to September 2022. He is also a professor of Computer Science and Engineering at IIT Kanpur from April 1991 and was Director General of Centre for Development of Advanced Computing from May 2011 to March 2017.

== Early life ==
He completed his BTech in Electrical Engineering from Indian Institute of Technology Kanpur. He earned his doctoral degree from the Department of Computer Science and Automation at Indian Institute of Science Bangalore, in 1989, under the supervision of Vaidyeswaran Rajaraman.

== Work ==
He joined at IIT Kanpur as a faculty member in 1991. Between 1994 and 1995, he was a visiting scientist at the Computer Science and Artificial Intelligence Laboratory (CSAIL), Massachusetts Institute of Technology. Later he was also associated with Mentor Graphics as Senior Engineering Manager. Here was involved in developing methods of translating software codes of electronic systems into hardware.

During his tenure at IIT Kanpur, he was involved in development of a smart card operating system for Electronic Passports. At C-DAC, he was instrumental on the SCOSTA compliant operating system development, and the technical improvements behind the Electronic Toll Collection (ETC) in India and Electronic Voting Machine (EVM) that uses RFID.

== Honor and awards ==
- Indo-US Science and Technology Fellowship (1994)
- Poonam and Prabhu Goel Chair Professorship (2008)
- VASVIK Industrial Research Award in Information and Communication Technology (2010)
- National Award for Best Electoral Practices, Election Commission of India (2016, 2020–21)

== Selected bibliography ==
=== Articles ===
- Nandy, S K; Deogaonkar, Anuradha; Moona, Rajat; Madhuri, C Sudha (2 June 2015). "K-d Tree based Gridless Maze Routing on Message Passing Multiprocessor Systems". IETE Journal of Research. 36 (3–4): 287–293. doi:10.1080/03772063.1990.11436895.
- Mujoo, Ashwani; Malviya, Manoj Kumar; Moona, Rajat; Prabhakar, T V (2000). "A Search Engine for Indian Languages". Electronic Commerce and Web Technologies. Lecture Notes in Computer Science. Vol. 1875. Springer Berlin Heidelberg. pp. 349–358. doi:10.1007/3-540-44463-7_30. ISBN 978-3-540-67981-3.
- Chandra, S.; Moona, R. (2000). "Retargetable functional simulator using high level processor models". VLSI Design 2000. Wireless and Digital Imaging in the Millennium. Proceedings of 13th International Conference on VLSI Design. IEEE Comput. Soc. pp. 424–429. doi:10.1109/ICVD.2000.812644. ISBN 0-7695-0487-6. S2CID 25990436.
- Rajesh, V.; Moona, R. (January 1999). "Processor modeling for hardware software codesign". Proceedings Twelfth International Conference on VLSI Design. (Cat. No.PR00013). pp. 132–137. doi:10.1109/ICVD.1999.745137. ISBN 0-7695-0013-7. S2CID 2708772.
- Moona, Rajat; Rajaraman, V. (December 1991). "A FIFO-based multicast network and its use in multicomputers". Microprocessors and Microsystems. 15 (10): 543–547. doi:10.1016/0141-9331(91)90013-6.

=== Patents ===
- Compiling memory dereferencing instructions from software to hardware in an electronic design (2004)
- Methods and systems for secured access to devices and systems (2006)
- Method and system for using personal devices for authentication and service access at service outlets (2009)

=== Books ===
- Moona, Rajat (2009). Assembly Language Programming in GNU/Linux for IA32 Architectures. PHI Learning Pvt. Ltd. ISBN 978-81-203-3156-3.
- Ghosh, Ratan K.; Gupta, Phalguni; Moona, Rajat (1995). Foundations of Parallel Processing. Narosa Publishing House. ISBN 978-81-7319-032-2.
