= IIT Bhilai =

Research institute in Bhilai, Chhasttisgarh, India

Indian Institute of Technology Bhilai
- भारतीय प्रौद्योगिकी संस्थान भिलाई
- University Logo
- Other name: IIT-BH
- Motto: Navācāroṇa samṛddhiśnute
- Motto in English: Innovation and Prosperity
- Type: Public Technical University
- Established: 2016 (10 years ago)
- Founder: Ministry of Education (India)
- Affiliations: Indian Institute of Technology, Ministry of Education (India), Government of India
- Academic affiliations: IIT Council
- Chairman: Krishnamurthi Venkataramanan
- Director: Rajiv Prakash
- Academic staff: 85
- Administrative staff: 160
- Students: 1267
- Undergraduates: 821 (BTech only)
- Postgraduates: 211 (MTech + MSc)
- Doctoral students: 235
- Location: Bhilai, Chhattisgarh, India
- Campus: 445 acres; Urban, Eco Friendly Campus
- Website: iitbhilai.ac.in

Indian Institute of Technology Bhilai (IIT Bhilai or IITBH) is a public research university and technical institute located in Bhilai, Chhattisgarh, India. Established in 2016, it is one of the Indian Institutes of Technology.

== History ==
On 7 August 2016, the Indian Institute of Technology Bhilai was inaugurated by the then Minister of Human Resource Development, Shri Prakash Javadekar, and the Chief Minister of Chhattisgarh Shri Raman Singh.

IIT Hyderabad was entrusted with the responsibility of mentoring the institute under the guidance of Prof. U.B. Desai, Director of IIT Hyderabad. The institute began operations from its transit campus located at the Government Engineering College (GEC) at Sejbahar, Raipur, where the first batch of students was inducted in 2016.

On 20 March 2017, Prof. Rajat Moona took charge as the Director of IIT Bhilai. Prior to joining IIT Bhilai, he served as the Director General of the Centre for Development of Advanced Computing (C-DAC), Government of India. He is affiliated with the Department of Computer Science and Engineering at IIT Kanpur.

Prof. Rajiv Prakash took charge as Director of IIT Bhilai on 26 September 2022. A professor of Materials Science and Technology at IIT (BHU) Varanasi, Prof. Prakash is one of India's foremost scientists in the fields of electronic polymers and nanocomposites, organic electronics, sensors, and energy storage devices.

IIT Bhilai shifted to its permanent campus on 1 August 2023, and the new B.Tech session commenced from the permanent campus.

== Campus ==
IIT Bhilai operates from a residential campus in Bhilai. The campus is expected to expand to accommodate 12,000 students over a 20-year period.

IIT Bhilai's master plan received GRIHA's highest five-star rating in the Large Development (LD) category, along with several exemplary performance awards. The institute has also received the Passive Architecture Design and Energy Management Award under the GRIHA rating system and the NSCI Safety Awards 2021.

== Academics ==
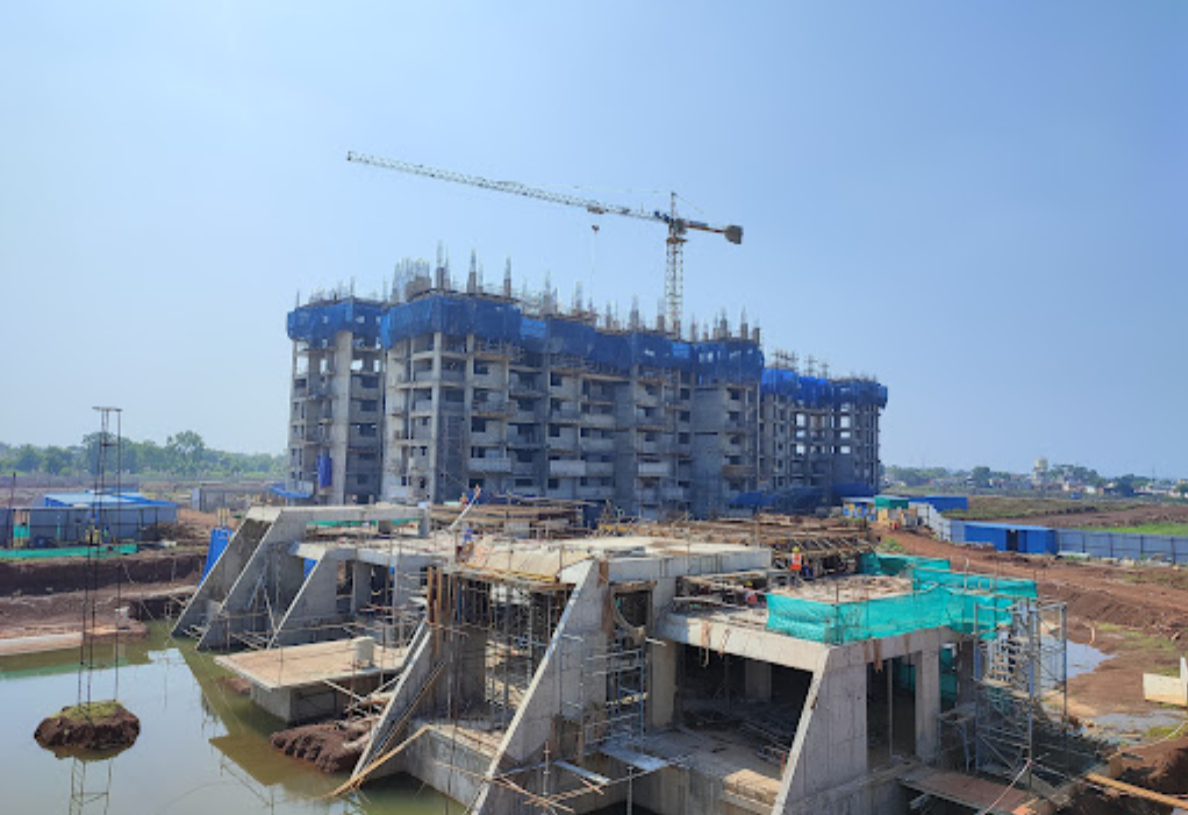
Construction undergoing for IITBH permanent campus

IIT Bhilai is ranked 72nd among the engineering colleges of India by National Institutional Ranking Framework (NIRF) in 2025. As of session 2024–25, there are 1267 students in total, including 821 BTech, 147 MTech, 64 MSc, and 235 PhD students with a ratio of 3.45:1 of men to women. IIT Bhilai offers Bachelor of Technology (BTech), Master of Technology (MTech), Master of Science (MSc) and Doctoral programs (PhD) in various departments.

=== Academic Departments ===
- Bioscience and Biomedical Engineering
- Chemistry
- Computer Science and Engineering (includes discipline of CSE & discipline of Data Science and Artificial Intelligence)
- Electronics and Communication Engineering
- Electrical Engineering
- Liberal Arts
- Material Science and Metallurgical Engineering
- Mathematics
- Mechanical Engineering
- Mechatronics
- Physics

=== Bachelor Programs ===
- Computer Science and Engineering (CS)
- Data Science and Artificial Intelligence (DS)
- Electronics and Communication Engineering (EC)
- Electrical Engineering (EE)
- Mechanical Engineering (ME)
- Material Science and Metallurgical Engineering (MM)
- and Mechatronics Engineering (MT)

=== Master of Technology Programs ===
- Biomedical Devices (BD)
- Bioengineering (BE)
- Computer Science and Engineering (CS)
- Data Science and Artificial Intelligence (DS)
- Communication and Signal Processing (CSP)
- Microelectronics and VLSI (MV)
- Control and Instrumentation (CI)
- Electric Vehicle Technology (EV)
- Power Systems and Power Electronics (PE)
- Material Science and Metallurgical Engineering (MM)
- Design and Manufacturing (DM)
- Thermal and Fluids Engineering (TF)
- Mechatronics Engineering (MT)

=== Master of Science Programs ===
- Physics (PH)
- Chemistry (CY)
- Mathematics and Computing (MA)

=== PhD Programs ===
- Bioscience and Biomedical Engineering (BM)
- Chemistry (CY)
- Computer Science and Engineering (CS)
- Data Science and Artificial Intelligence (DS)
- Electronics & Communication Engineering (EC)
- Electrical Engineering (EE)
- Liberal Arts (LA)
- Mathematics (MA)
- Materials Science and Metallurgical Engineering (MM)
- Mechanical Engineering (ME)
- Mechatronics Engineering (MT)
- Physics (PH)

== Facilities ==
The academic building houses the central library, various laboratories and workshops which are equipped with state-of-the-art apparatus.

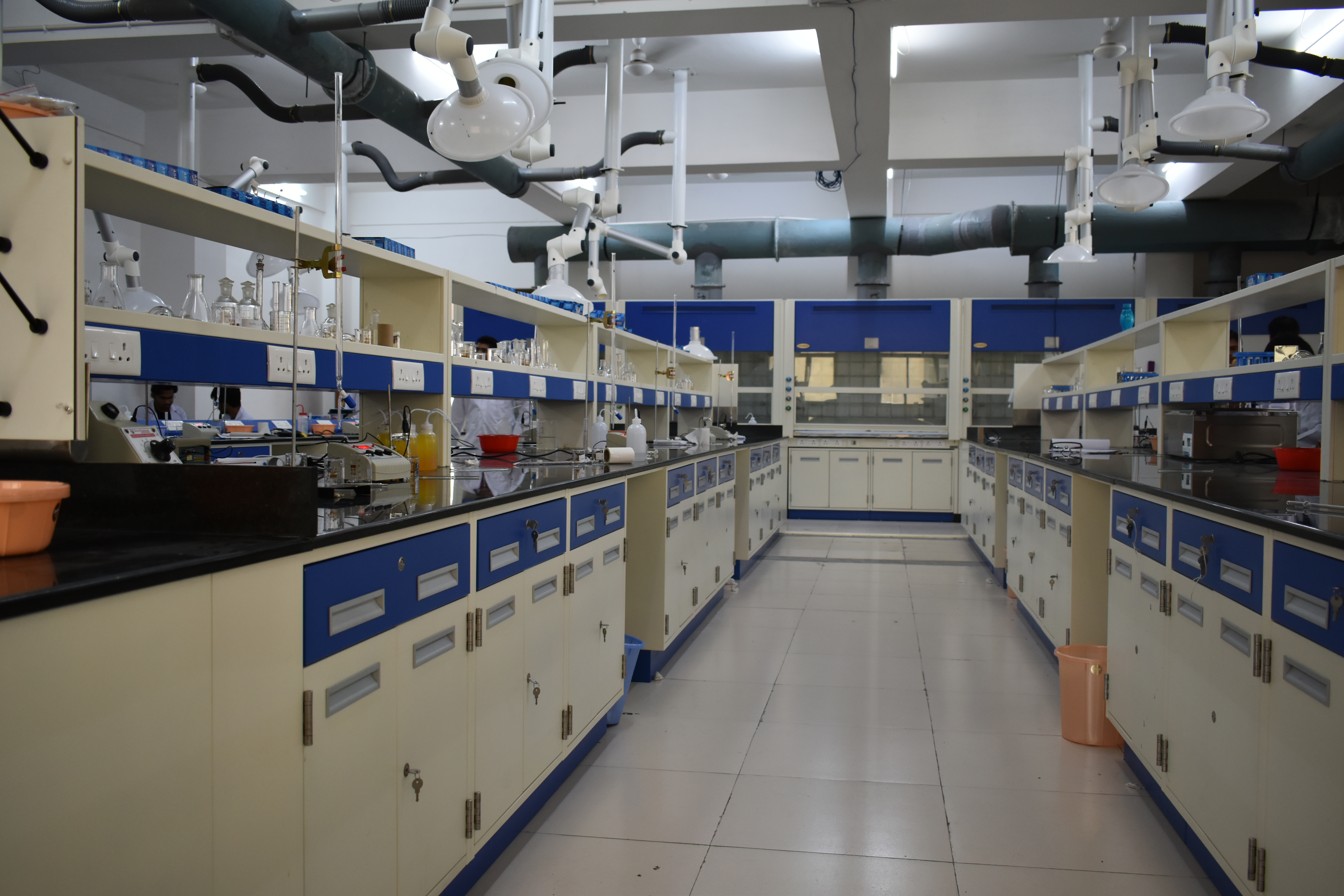
Chemistry Lab at IIT Bhilai

=== Laboratories ===
There are four laboratories – Computer Centre, Electrical Lab, Physics Lab, and Chemistry lab.

The institute has two computer laboratories. The labs have a total of 64 Dell OptiPlex 9020 MT Desktops with 4 GB RAM and 500 GB hard disks, and six Dell PowerEdge R 630 servers.

=== Workshops ===
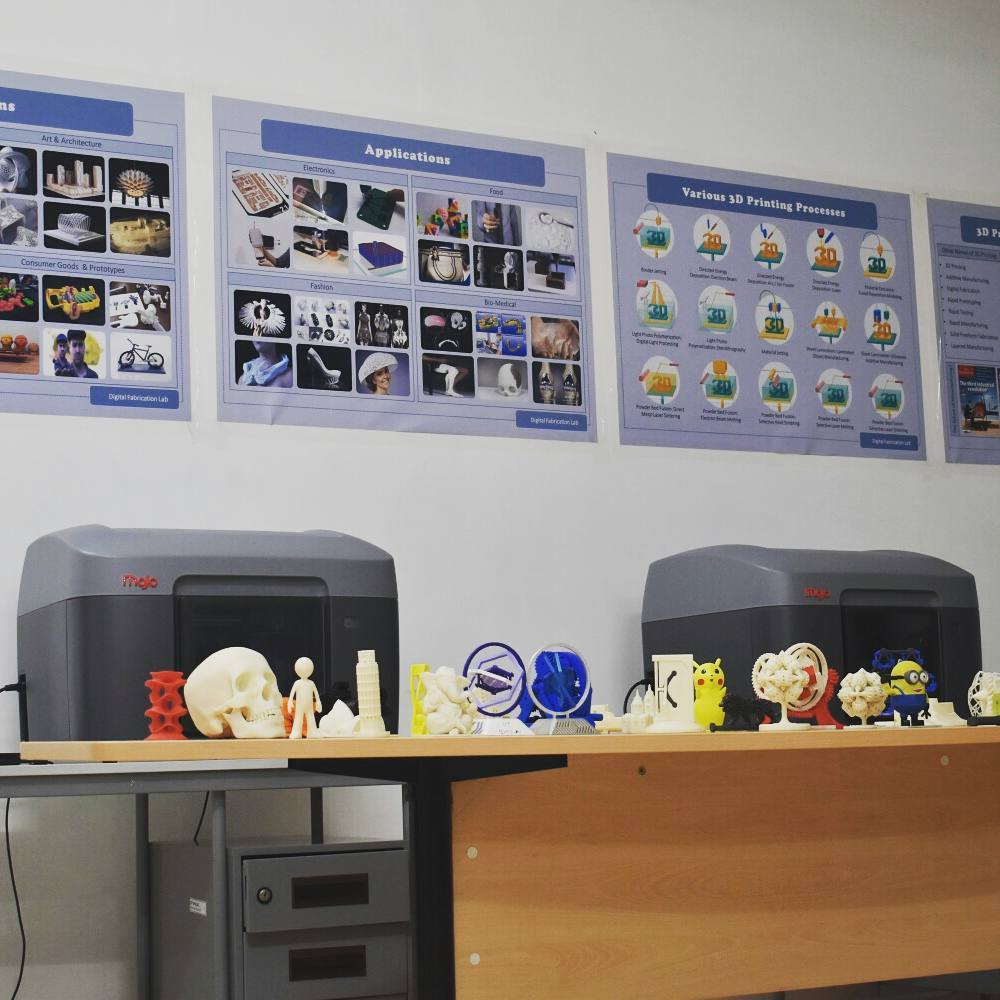
The Digital Fabrication Lab at IIT Bhilai

Workshops have been set up in the main building which support prototyping and building of various projects undertaken by both undergraduate as well as post-graduate students. The workshops play an integral role in the curriculum by providing hands-on training to the students. These workshops have served as incubation centers for the first automobile car developed by the students of the mechanical engineering department.

- Digital Fabrication Lab: Equipped with 3D printers and 3D scanners, the Digital fabrication lab caters to the needs of rapid prototyping of plastic parts for various projects. The students learn the basics of designing in the freshman year by courtesy of a course on 3D printing which introduces CAD modelling and gradually builds up to having the students make their own 3D printed projects.
- Do It Yourself (DIY) Lab: The lab provides hands on training of various manufacturing processes. Prioritizing the safety of the students, the training is carried out using table-top machinery and cold-casting in lieu of the traditional methods. The students are introduced to various machinery including Laser cutters, CNCs and Lathes.

=== Partnerships and collaborations ===
- Bhilai Steel Plant (BSP) has signed a MoU with IIT Bhilai for Industry Academic Collaboration. As part of the MoU that IIT Bhilai signed with Bhilai Steel Plant, IIT Bhilai will provide its services through its faculty and staff members in the areas of joint research & development activities, including those related to innovation & creativity, joint exploration in areas of steel-making, manufacturing, fabrication processes, information technology, etc. to troubleshoot technical problems in various production processes of Bhilai Steel Plant. BSP shall provide internship and project-work opportunities to B.Tech. and M.Tech. students and research scholars from IIT Bhilai.
- MoU signed between IIT Bhilai and Chhattisgarh Biofuel Development Authority (CBDA) for Academic and Research Cooperation in Biofuels & Bioenergy, on 20 May 2019.
- MoU signed between IIT Bhilai and CDAC Pune to collaborate on technological development and deployment in the areas of mutual interest, on 14 April 2019.
- MoU signed between IIT Bhilai and 36Inc - Startup Chhattisgarh for Academic and Research Cooperation on 5 January 2019.
- In 2018 the institute's Innovation Council (IIC) was established under the MHRD's Innovation Cell (MIC) scheme. The IIC of IIT Bhilai was recognized by MIC on 21 November 2018.
- MoU signed between IIT Bhilai and Vara Technologies for imparting skills on Cyber Security and Internet of Things (IoT), on 11 October 2018.
- MoU signed between IIT Bhilai and Infineon Technologies for joint promotion of Infineon's security solutions, on 27 September 2018.
- MoU signed between IIT Bhilai and Centre for Materials for Electronics Technology (C-MET) for Academic and Research Cooperation on 23 July 2018.
- MoU signed between IIT Bhilai and CSIR-National Chemical Laboratory, Pune, India for Academic and Research Cooperation on 7 June 2018.
- MoU was signed between IIT Bhilai and National Chin-Yi University of Technology, Taiwan to partner student/faculty exchange and to foster R&D projects on 2 May 2018.
- IIT Bhilai had signed an MoU with Central Public Works Department, Government of India for construction of various components of building and allied service in the permanent campus on 14 March 2018.
- MoU signed between IIT Bhilai and IIT Kanpur for sharing of Web-based software on 21 April 2017.

== Student life ==
Apart from the academics, the student life at IIT Bhilai various includes extra-curricular activities which are held by various student clubs. In support of various social causes, the students also volunteer for different activities under the National Service Scheme. Regular drives of Swachh Bharat Mission are carried out within the campus as well as around it. The students are also involved in teaching drives which cover the neighboring schools in the villages.

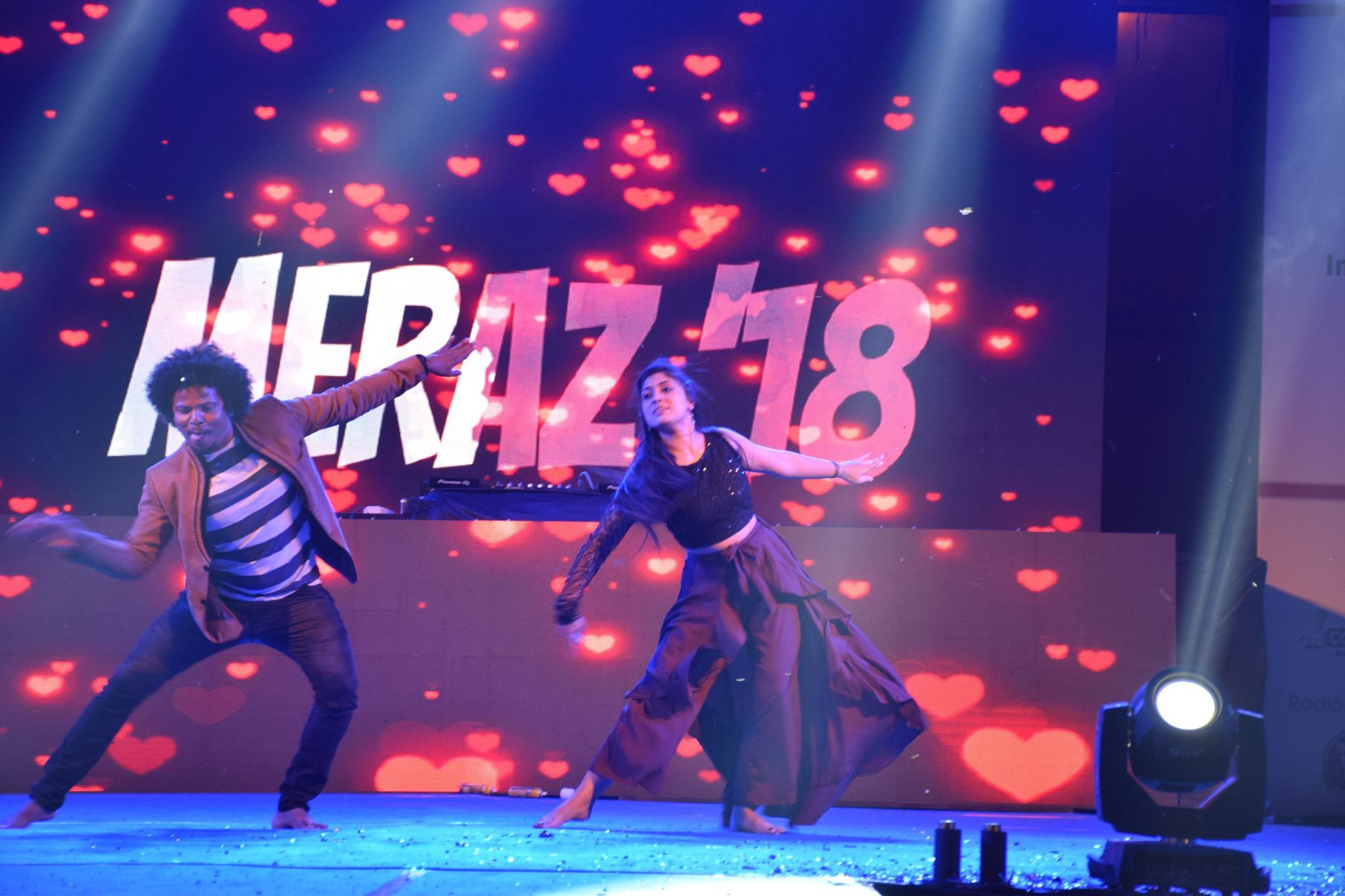
A dance performance during MERAZ 2018

=== Council of Student Affairs (CoSA) ===
The Council of Student Affairs (CoSA) was established in 2018. The CoSA is an extension of the student gymkhana system - which was in place during the academic year 2017–18. The CoSA is a canopy for two parallel bodies—The Student Gymkhana (responsible for managing cultural, technical, sports and outreach activities) and the Students’ Senate (manages academic concerns). The bodies consist of elected student representatives from both UG and PG levels and are guided by the faculty members. The President heads the CoSA. The Student Gymkhana and the Students’ Senate further consists of elected students representing various spheres of concern such as cultural (music, dance, art, drama), sports, academics and so on. In 2018, the elections to the above posts were carried out using Electronic Voting Machines (EVMs) and a cent percent voting attendance was recorded.

=== Meraz (Techno-Cultural Fest) ===
Within a couple of years since its inception, IIT Bhilai conducted its first major annual technical and cultural festival—Meraz. The fest was held in October 2018 over a span of three days and featured events and performances by various professionals from both the technical and entertainment industries. With an attendance of over a thousand students from all across the state, Meraz created further technical and cultural diversity.

=== IIT Bhilai Motorsports ===
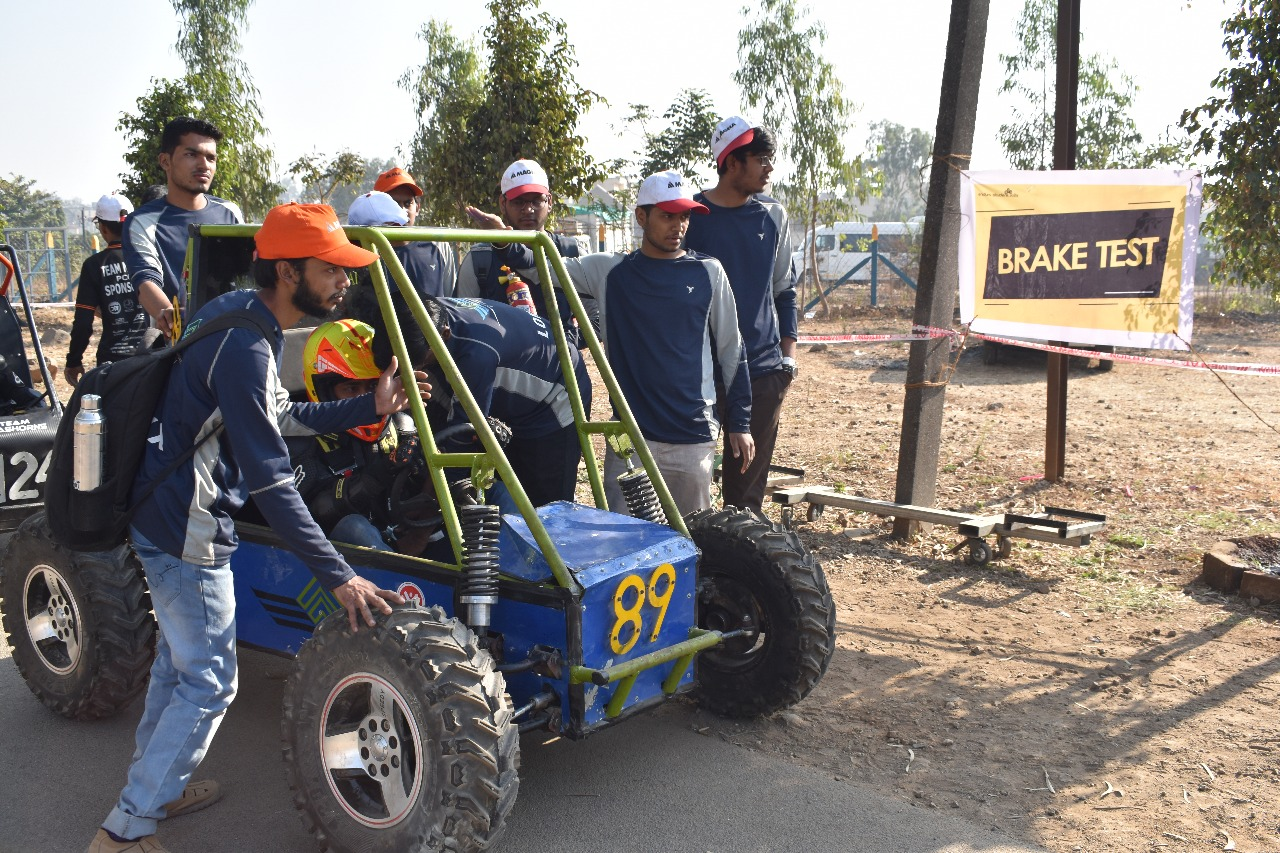
The IIT Bhilai Motorsports team in Enduro Student India 2019

IIT Bhilai Motorsports is a student team as a part of Motorsports Club from Indian Institute of Technology Bhilai. The Club being established in 2017, consists of 40+ members targeting to design and fabricate ATV to compete in national level all-terrain vehicle events.

IIT Bhilai Motorsports made its debut at Enduro Student India (ESI) 2019, being the only 3rd gen IIT to participate in this competition. The team successfully cleared technical inspections based on design, engine check and brake check test in static events. In dynamics, the team actively participated in all the events—DirtX, Sprint, Acceleration & Maneuverability as well as Endurance race.

A team of 17 members represented IIT Bhilai Motorsports at Pune in the competition along with more than 70 other teams.

=== Sports ===
Apart from the technical laboratories, the transit campus also offers the students an opportunity to practice various sports. Floodlight enabled football ground, volleyball court, basketball court and indoor badminton courts serve as the focal point of sports development in IIT Bhilai.

- Prayatna is a multi-sport, intra-institute event held annually during the winter semester. It was started in 2018 with the motive of encouraging sports as an integral part of one's holistic development. Prayatna spans over two and a half months featuring 5 to 6 teams competing in various indoor and outdoor games.
- Inter-IIT Sports Meet: IIT Bhilai has been an active participant in the prestigious Inter-IIT games, sending its contingent from the first year itself to the Inter-IIT Sports Meet 2016. In 2017 the institute grabbed its first major trophy by winning the Inter-IIT Impact League.

=== Covid-19 innovations ===
- Chemistry Department has developed hand sanitizers, to use across the campus.
- Mechanical Engineering Department has developed novel technologies to help medical doctors and health care personnel like a full face mask, which is not only to protect the mouth and the nose, but also covers the eyes and ears. Reusability is the biggest advantage of the mask and it can be prepared for reuse within 30 minutes. Two N95 compatible filters are attached to this mask for sufficient air circulation. There is an additional feature for attaching hazmat clothing to the mask, which enhances its protection levels while putting on and removing the mask.
- A first generation nasal test swab has been fabricated in-house using biocompatible material. A nanoparticle-based anti-viral/anti-microbial coating on clothing has been developed.
- The institute has worked on building a PAN IIT alumni network for defining COVID-19 test plans.
- A contactless water dispenser has been designed by the Electrical Engineering Lab. It is an IR sensor based device, designed for indoor applications like a water dispenser for washing hands or drinking water kiosk.
- During these testing times IIT Bhilai has come forward and is providing its ambulance services in collaboration with Sumit Foundation, Raipur for needy patients.

== See also ==
- Education in India
- Indian Institutes of Technology (IITs)
- List of universities in India
- University Grants Commission (India)
