= IIT Jammu =

Research institute in Jammu, India

Indian Institute of Technology Jammu
- Motto: Vidyādhanaṃ sarvadhana pradhānam (Sanskrit)
- Motto in English: Knowledge is Supreme of all Wealth
- Type: Public technical university
- Established: 2016; 10 years ago
- Chairman: Sharad Kumar Saraf
- Director: Manoj Singh Gaur
- Academic staff: 116
- Students: 1,178
- Undergraduates: 784
- Postgraduates: 149
- Doctoral students: 245
- Location: Jammu, J&K, India; 32°48′13″N 74°53′45″E
- Campus: Urban
- Acronym: IITJMU
- Colours: Blue Sky blue White
- Website: www.iitjammu.ac.in

The Indian Institute of Technology Jammu (IIT Jammu or IITJmu) is a public research university located in Jammu, Jammu and Kashmir, India. As one of India's Indian Institutes of Technology, the university came into existence in 2016 when a Memorandum of Understanding (MoU) between Department of Higher Education, Government of Jammu and Kashmir and Department of Higher Education, Ministry of Human Resource Development (MHRD), Government of India, was signed. The IIT campus has been constructed in the village of Jagti, in Nagrota Tehsil, in Jammu district.

== Campus ==
=== Temporary campus ===
Set up in the LCD campus, the temporary campus of IIT Jammu has a total of 40,000 sq.ft. built-up area including hostels, house classrooms, a seminar room, a library, a computer Laboratory, faculty offices, a cafeteria, and recreational and creative facilities. The campus has volleyball, basketball, badminton courts, and cricket nets. Indoor sports facilities include table tennis, carom, chess, and snooker. Rooms for music, dance, and other activities are also available.

Initially, the first batch of B.Tech. students stayed at the temporary campus for the first two years. They were subsequently transferred to the transit Campus once it was finished to stay with all the subsequent batches. The temporary campus now houses only the Ph.D. students and research scholars.

=== Permanent campus ===
The State Government provided 159 hectares of land for establishment of IIT Jammu. The agreement was signed by Prof. V. Ramgopal Rao, Director, IIT Delhi, for and on behalf of MHRD, Government of India, being the mentor Institute and Shri Hemant Sharma, Secretary to Government, Higher Education Department Government of Jammu and Kashmir. IIT Jammu started functioning in 2016 from a Temporary campus within Jammu city. Construction of transit campus also started at the same time, and it was ready for operations within a year. The transit campus, spread over 25 acres within the site of the permanent campus, with built up area of about 2 lakh sq. ft. became operational from August, 2017, with the 2017-18 session commencing on permanent campus. The hostels are well equipped for lodging and boarding for 650 students. Currently, it houses full strength of the B.Tech. and M.Tech. students. The on-campus facilities include hostel accommodation for all students closer to academic area, cafeteria, open gym, laundry centers, digital classrooms, WiFi, music room, TT tables, snooker table, dispensary, and a common hall with TV for indoor recreational activities. The campus has volleyball, basketball, badminton courts, and cricket nets; a football ground is under construction. ICICI and J&K Bank have set up their ATMs alongside the hostels near cafeteria. The campus is well connected to Jammu city, and is located on National Highway 44 (India), 6–7 km. from the main Jammu City.

== Academic profile ==
The academic programme at IIT Jammu followed the curriculum of Indian Institute of Technology Delhi (IIT Delhi) until 2018 entry B.Tech. batches. Batches admitted to B.Tech. programme in 2019 and onward follow IIT Jammu curriculum. The curriculum is designed considering India's New Education Policy. In the first year, students are taught basic sciences and engineering. In addition, non-graded courses on language, professional ethics & social responsibility, and introduction to engineering are also included. The institute follows a credit system, and the performance in a course is continuously evaluated. A relative grading system is followed for first-year students, and for rest of the years, it solely depends on the institute's academic and course coordinator. Institute has started using ERP from July 2018.

=== Programmes ===
The institute conducts educational programs leading to the degrees of Bachelor of Technology (B.Tech.), Master of Technology(M.Tech.) and Ph.D. in the following areas:

Degree	Specialization
Bachelor of Technology (B.Tech.)	Chemical Engineering, Mathematics and Computing, Civil Engineering, Computer Science and Engineering, Electrical Engineering, Engineering Physics, Materials Engineering, Mechanical Engineering.
Master of Technology (M.Tech.)	Computer Science and Engineering with specialization in Data Science and Information Security, Electrical Engineering with specialization in Communications and Signal Processing, Civil Engineering with specialization in Tunnel Engineering, Thermal Engineering - Combined course from Mechanical & Chemical Engineering Department, Computer Technology (RA) -Combined course from CSE & Electrical department.
Master of Technology (M.Tech. (Executive))	Artificial Intelligence and Machine Learning
Ph.D.	Chemistry, Civil Engineering, Computer Science and Engineering, Electrical Engineering, Humanities and Social Sciences, Mathematics, Materials Engineering, Mechanical Engineering, Physics .

=== Ranking ===
University rankings

Engineering – India
- NIRF (2024): 62

As per NIRF (National Institutional Ranking Framework) Engineering College rankings in 2024, IIT Jammu was ranked at 62 in the 'Engineering' category. Amongst all the third generation IITs, IIT Tirupati secured the best rank of 61. IIT Jammu is followed by IIT Palakkad, IIT Bhilai, and IIT Dharwad at ranks 64, 73, and between 101-150, respectively.

== Collaborations ==
=== Indian Army's Northern Command ===
On 5th March 2021, IIT Jammu signed an MoU with the Indian Army's Northern Command to provide innovative solutions and research and development expertise in the domains of surveillance, communication, cloud computing, big data analytics, artificial intelligence (AI), manufacturing and construction field engineering projects to help the army on the ground.

=== School of Artillery, Nashik ===
On 15th October 2025, an MoU was signed by Brigadier Akash Bajaj, Technology and Trials Wing, School of Artillery, and Prof. Manoj Singh Gaur, Director, IIT Jammu to formalize a strategic collaboration in advanced defense research and technology development. This partnership is focused on joint initiatives across: Energy and Propulsion Systems, Hypersonics and High-Speed Flow Research, Loitering Munitions, RWI/RPAs and UCAV Technologies, AI and Machine Learning, Education and Capacity Building.

=== CST Advanced Systems Pvt Ltd. ===
A private-academia collaboration between CST Advanced Systems Pvt. Ltd. and IIT Jammu developed anti-GPS jamming devices and identification friend or foe systems (IFF). These devices aim at enhancing the operational efficiency and effectiveness of the armed forces during counter terrorism operations.

=== CSIR-Indian Institute of Integrative Medicine (CSIR-IIIM) ===
IIT Jammu signed a tripartite MoU with CSIR - Indian Institute of Integrative Medicine and three start-ups (Biogreen Projects, Evlogia Eco Care and Crop Domain) to streamline pathways for laboratory innovations and reach commercial deployment in healthcare, sustainable materials and agri-biotech sectors.

== See also ==
- Indian Institutes of Technology
- List of universities in India
