= U. B. Desai =

Indian academician

Uday B. Desai
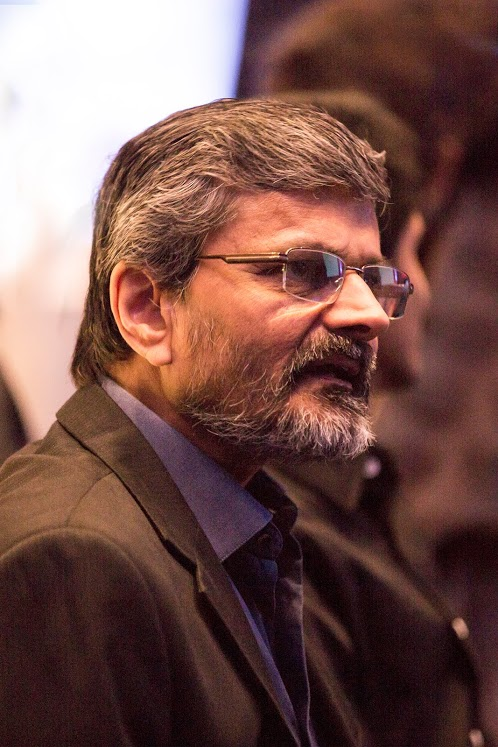
- Born: India
- Education: Johns Hopkins University, University at Buffalo, IIT Kanpur
- Awards: Fellow, Indian National Science Academy
- Scientific career
- Fields: Electrical engineering
- Workplaces: Indian Institute of Technology Hyderabad, Indian Institute of Technology Bombay, Washington State University
- Website: Webpage

Uday B. Desai is an Indian academician and the founding director of Indian Institute of Technology Hyderabad. He is Professor Emeritus in Electrical engineering at IIT Hyderabad, Chancellor ICFAI Dehradun, Chancellor Anurag University, Hyderabad, Vice-President Indian National Academy of Engineering (INAE), Honorary Distinguished Professor Plaksha University, Mohali. He is member of Board of Governor of many academic institutions and member or chair of committees in DST and MEITY. He served as the director of IIT Hyderabad from June 2009 to July 2019, and is credited for taking it to rank among the top 10 engineering colleges in India in the NIRF engineering ranking. He was mentor director of IIT Bhilai from May 2016 to February 2017 and mentor director for IIIT Chittoor 2013–2018.

== Early life ==
Uday Desai received his B.Tech. degree from IIT Kanpur in 1974, did his M.S. from the State University of New York, Buffalo in 1976, and Ph.D. from Johns Hopkins University, Baltimore, U.S.A. in 1979, all in electrical engineering.

== Career ==
From 1979 to 1984 he was an assistant professor in the School of Electrical Engineering and Computer Science Department at Washington State University, Pullman, WA, U.S.A., and an associate professor at the same university from 1984 to 1987.

=== IIT Bombay ===
From 1987 to May 2009 he was a professor in the Electrical Engineering Department at the Indian Institute of Technology Bombay. He was dean of students at IIT-Bombay from August 2000 to July 2002. He has held visiting associate professor's position at Arizona State University, Purdue University, and Stanford University. He was a visiting professor at EPFL, Lausanne during the summer of 2002. From July 2002 to June 2004 he was the Director of HP-IITM R and D Lab. at IIT Madras.

=== Academic interests ===
His research interest is in Cyber physical systems, AI, Internet of things, wireless communication, and statistical signal processing. He has been a coauthor of 9 research monographs, author of an edited book, and author / co-author of nearly 300 peered reviewed papers in international journals and conferences.

=== IIT Hyderabad ===
He was the director of IIT Hyderabad from June 2009 to July 2019. In his tenure, the institute was ranked in the top 10 in NIRF engineering ranking for four consecutive years. He focused more on research and innovation at IITH. He also focused on building a world class campus in collaboration with Japan. As an example please see

https://www.youtube.com/watch?v=vBulp-_BMuU&t=5s .[10]

== Awards and honors ==
- Outstanding Alumni award from University of Buffalo in 2015
- Distinguished Alumni Award from IIT Kanpur in 2016
- Fellow of Indian National Science Academy (INSA)
- Fellow of Indian National Academy of Engineering (INAE)
- Fellow of The Institution of Electronic & Telecommunication Engineers (IETE)
- Senior Member of IEEE
- Recipient of J C Bose Fellowship
- Excellence in Teaching Award from IIT Bombay for 2007

He was on the board of Tata Communications Limited. He is a member on various boards and governing councils of several academic institutions and organizations. He is on the board of Talent Sprint an NSE company. He is one of the founding members of COMSNETS and also Society for Cancer Research and Communication. He was the chair for IEEE Bombay Section 2006–2008. He was also on the Visitation Panel for University of Ghana.

== Interests ==
- Cyber Physical Systems
- AI
- Wireless Communication
- Signal processing
- Wireless Sensor Networks
- Adaptive signal processing
- Information and Communication Technology for Socioeconomic Development
- Image Processing and Computer Vision
- Wavelets and Multiresolution analysis
- Artificial neural networks
- Biomedical Signal and Image Processing

== Fellowships ==
- Fellow, Indian National Science Academy (2005)
- Fellow, Indian National Academy of Engineering
- Recipient of J. C. Bose Fellowship
- Fellow, Institution of Electronics and Telecommunication Engineers
