= National Service Scheme =

Indian government sector public service program

Agency overview
- Formed: 24 September 1969
- Jurisdiction: Government of India
- Motto: Not Me But You
- Parent agency: Ministry of Youth Affairs and Sports
- Website: nss.gov.in

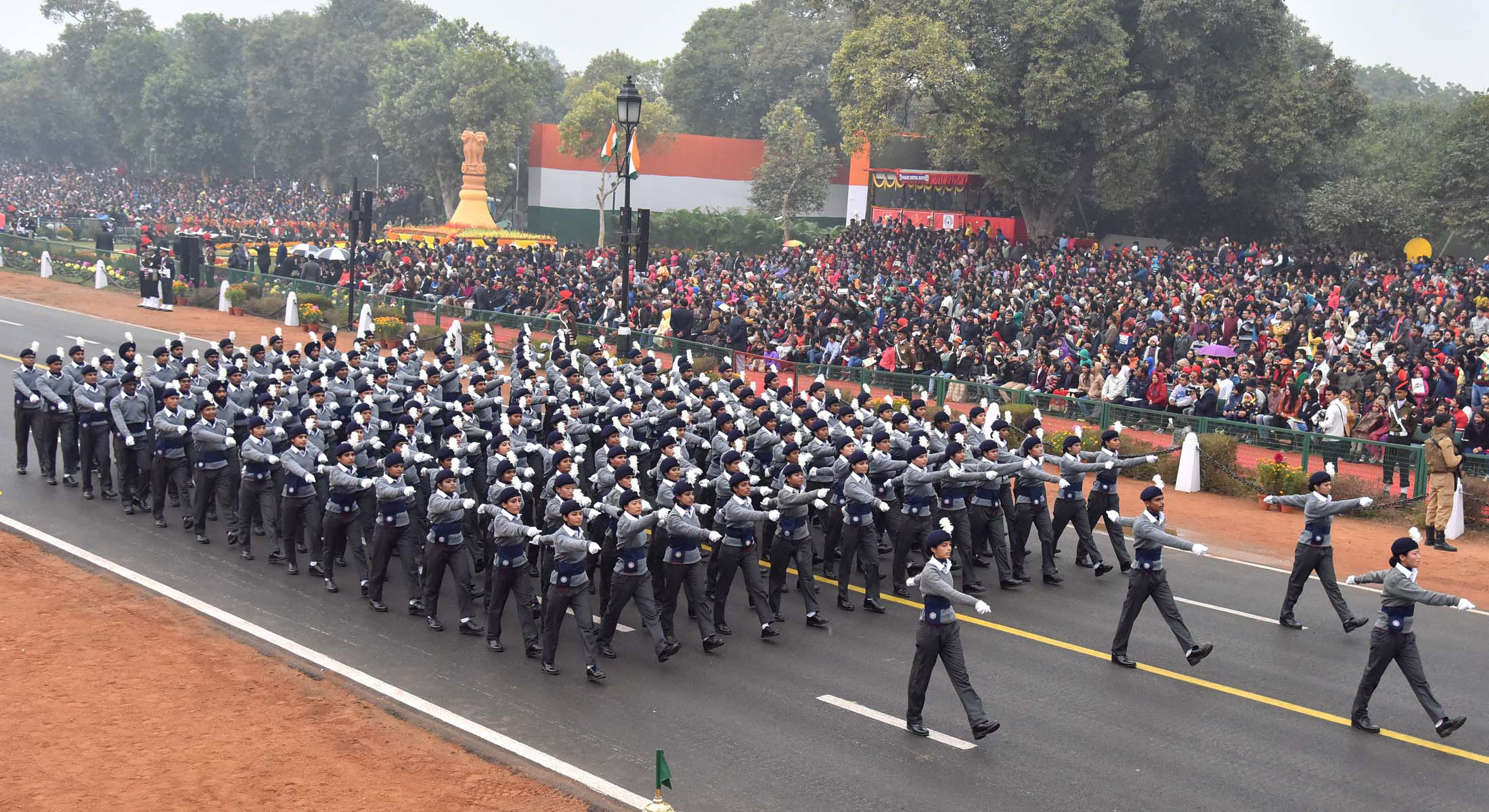
The National Service Scheme (NSS) Marching Contingen

The National Service Scheme (NSS) is an Indian government sector public service program conducted by the Ministry of Youth Affairs and Sports of the Government of India aimed at developing the personality and civic responsibility of student volunteers through community service. With the motto "Not Me But You," it engages millions of students in higher education institutions and senior secondary schools across the country in regular and special camping activities focused on education, health, environment, disaster relief, and social welfare. Launched as a pilot in 1969 across 37 universities with 40,000 volunteers, NSS has grown to encompass over 39,000 units and approximately 3.6 to 4.3 million active volunteers in recent years, with more than 47.8 million students having participated since inception.

== History ==
Mahatma Gandhi emphasized students' social responsibility alongside their education. Equally, the post-independence era of India urged an introduction for social service by students. This idea was considered in 1950 and 1952 and educational institutions launched various labour and service camps, campus work projects, and village apprenticeship programs.

In 1959, state education ministers were presented with the idea of involving students in organized national service in India. A National Service Committee was established on 28 August 1959 under the chair, C. D. Deshmukh, to pilot the idea. The recommendation was a period of nine months to a year of national service.

In April 1967, a conference of state education ministers suggested students could choose between the National Cadet Corps (NCC), a new National Service Scheme (NSS), and athletes could join the National Sports Organisation (NSO).

The pilot project was started in 1967 from Delhi University and concluded at Rajghat camp inaugurated by Dr VKRV RAO JI on June 1969.K.K.Gupta from DU was declared 1st volunteer of thescheme, a conference convened by the Ministry of Education and the University Grants Commission supported a national service scheme as an instrument of national integration. The NSS was formally launched on 24 th September of 1969, the birth-centenary year of Mahatma Gandhi, in 37 universities and approximately 40,000 student volunteers.

The inaugural NSS Republic Day Camp launched in 1988. Select volunteers attend the Republic Day Parade annually.

== Motto & objectives ==
The motto for the NSS is, "Not me but you", with a goal of "education through service" emphasizing the integration of community with the educational process. The NSS is focused on developing students' character and personality through community service.

== Volunteer requirements ==
Enrollment into the program is open to students in the 11th and 12th grade, technical institutions, and graduate programs after passing a screening process. Volunteers must fulfill specific criteria over a two-year period. Each members must complete a minimum of 120 service hours per year for two consecutive years. During the two-year period, each individual must participate in a special 7-day special camp. These camps are held in adopted villages within an 8 kilometer radius of one's academic institution.

=== Activities ===
Regular activities held by the NSS include health drives focused on blood donations, disease awareness, and personal hygiene. Environmental conservation initiatives include tree planting, cleanliness campaigns, and waste management initiatives. Literacy programs for adults and underprivileged children; volunteers also help with school administration in rural areas. Infrastructure improvement programs to improve roads, bridges, ponds, and developing villages. Social awareness programs are held to educate against caste discrimination and gender inequality, and substance abuse.

== Administrative structure ==
From the initial 37 universities, the NSS has expanded to hundreds of universities with several million volunteers. Starting the 2016-2017 fiscal year, the NSS became a Central Sector Scheme (CSS) with 100% funding from the Government of India under the Ministry of Youth Affairs and Sports.

== See also ==
- National Cadet Corps (India) (NCC)
- Rashtriya Indian Military College (RIMC)
