= National Sports Organisation (India) =

The National Sports Organisation (NSO) is an initiative by the Government of India aimed at promoting the development of athletics and sporting activities among the nation's youth. It is present in many significant institutions across India, including the Indian Institutes of Technology (IITs) and Indian Institutes of Management (IIMs).
