= IIT Gandhinagar =

Research institute in Gandhinagar, Gujarat, India

Indian Institute of Technology Gandhinagar
- Motto: Students First
- Type: Public technical university
- Established: 2008 (18 years ago)
- Chairman: Sanjiv Puri
- Director: Rajat Moona
- Academic staff: 171
- Students: 2,356
- Undergraduates: 1,132
- Postgraduates: 576
- Doctoral students: 648
- Location: Gandhinagar, Gujarat, India; 23°12′41.12″N 72°40′55.42″E
- Campus: 399 acres (1.61 km^{2}); Urban
- Acronym: IITGN
- Website: iitgn.ac.in

Indian Institute of Technology Gandhinagar (also known as IIT Gandhinagar or IITGN) is a good public technical university located in Gandhinagar, Gujarat, India and recognized as an Institute of National Importance by the Government of India. It was established in 2008 and operates over a roughly 400-acre, environmentally certified campus along the banks of the Sabarmati river.

== History ==
=== Foundation ===
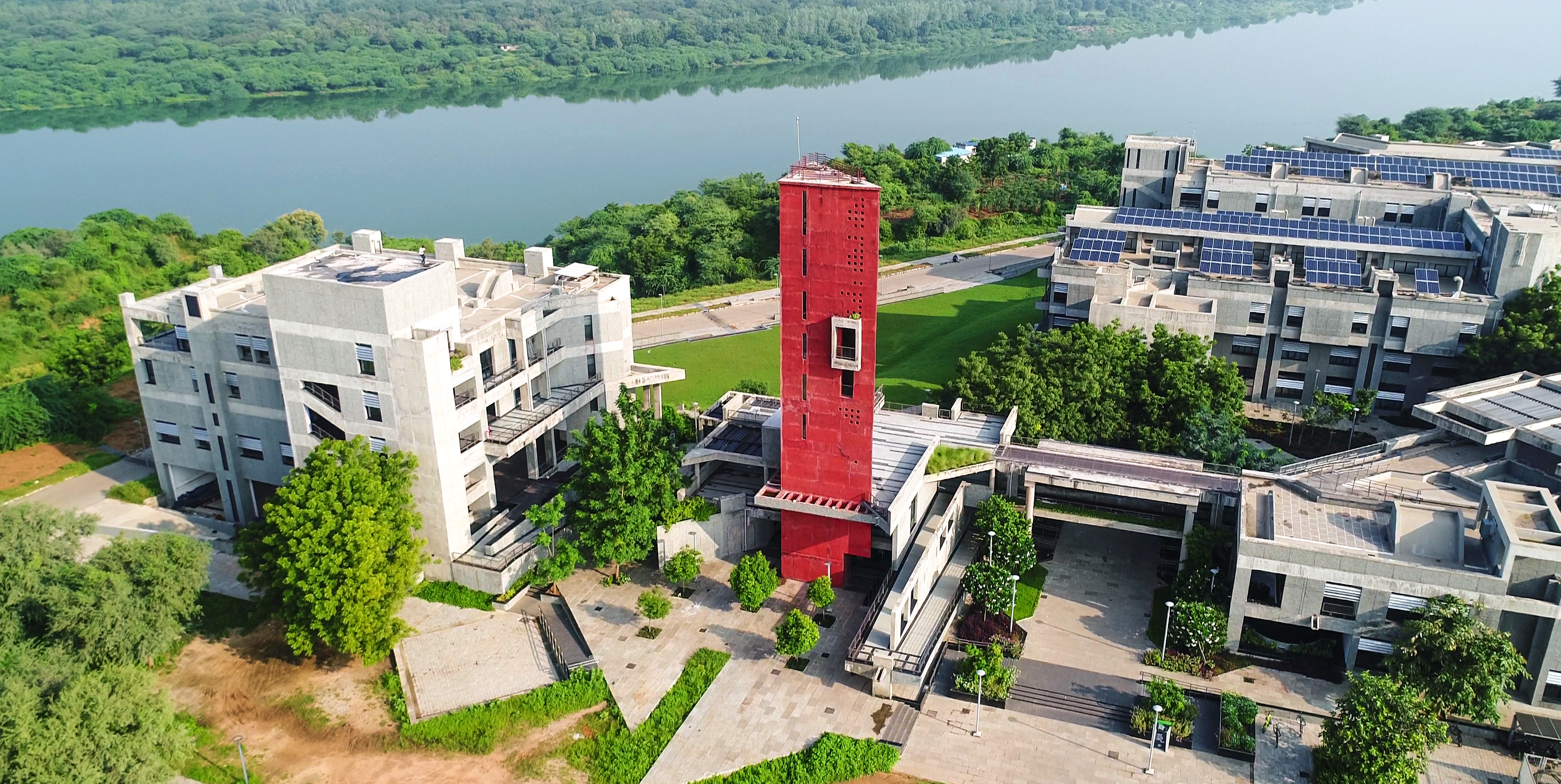
IIT Gandhinagar Campus with landmark tower

IIT Gandhinagar is one of the eight new Indian Institutes of Technology (IITs) announced by India's Ministry of Human Resource Development in 2008. It began operations that same year from a temporary campus at Vishwakarma Government Engineering College in Ahmedabad, under the mentorship of Indian Institute of Technology Bombay. The first batch of students was admitted to three BTech programmes: Chemical Engineering, Mechanical Engineering, and Electrical Engineering.

IITGN was included in the Institutes of Technology (Amendment) Act, 2011, which was passed by the Lok Sabha on 24 March 2011 and approved the Rajya Sabha on 30 April 2012.

Land for the permanent campus, located on the banks the Sabarmati in Palaj was provided by the Government of Gujarat on a 99-year lease with a token rent of one rupee. This was publicly stated in a 2011 address at the Amalthea technology summit by the then Chief Minister of Gujarat, Narendra Modi. The institute took possession of over 400 acres of land in August 2012, with regular classes and other activities on the new campus starting around July 2015.

== Academics ==
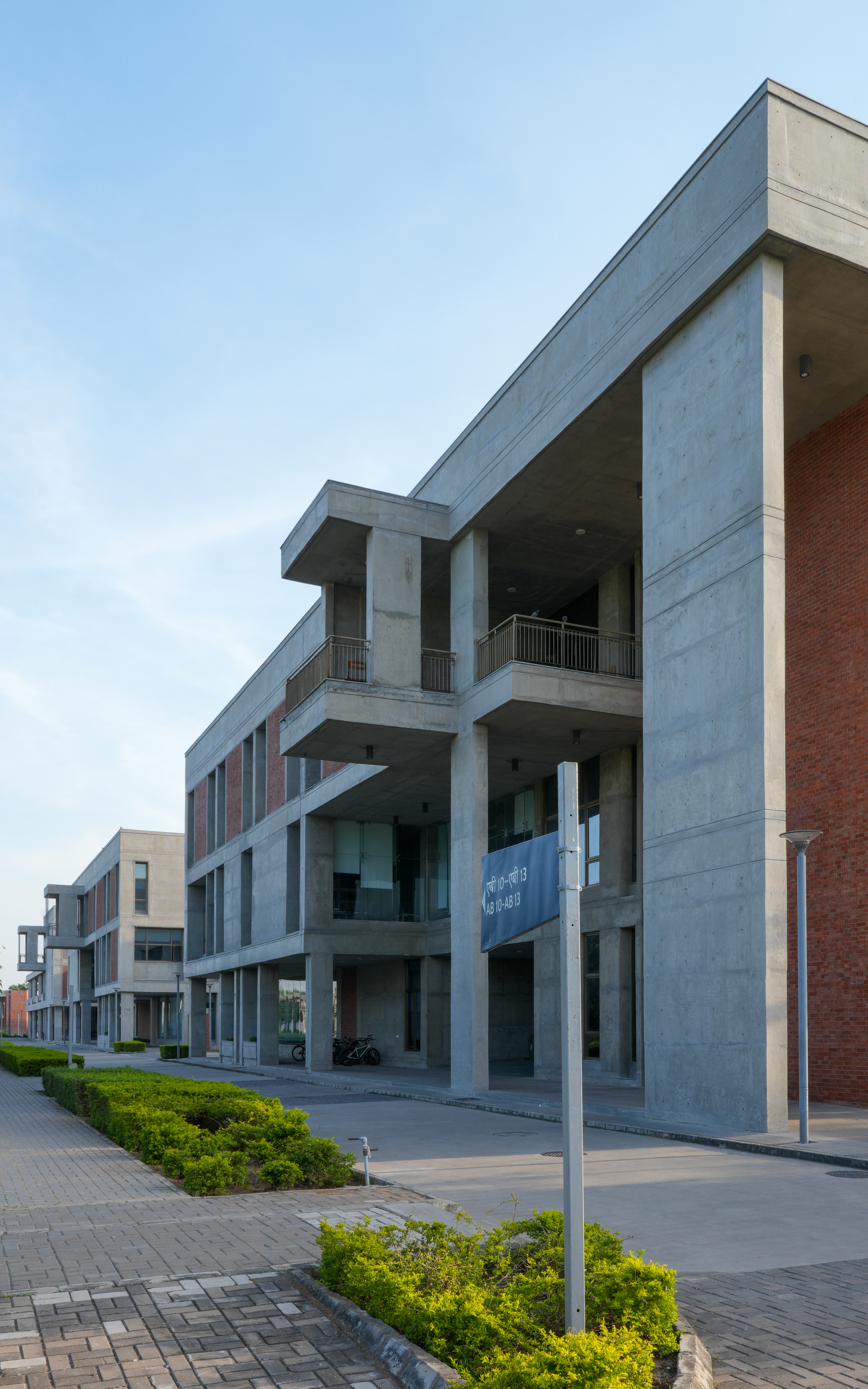
Academic Blocks AB-13 and AB-11

The Indian Institute of Technology, Gandhinagar. as one of the 23 IITs offers a diverse range of undergraduate, postgraduate and doctoral programmes across engineering, sciences and the humanities through its thirteen departments and seven centres.

=== Departments ===
- Biological Sciences and Engineering
- Civil Engineering
- Chemical Engineering
- Computer Science and Engineering
- Electrical Engineering
- Mechanical Engineering
- Materials Engineering
- Chemistry
- Mathematics
- Physics
- Cognitive and Brain Sciences
- Earth Sciences
- Humanities and Social Sciences

=== Centres ===
- Archaeological Sciences
- Biomedical Engineering
- Design and Innovation
- Safety Engineering
- Sustainable Development
- Centre for AI-Driven Innovations
- Sustainable Development
- Centre for Research Commercialization
- Centre for Creative Learning

=== Admissions ===
Admissions for the undergraduate engineering programs at IIT Gandhinagar are done through the JOSAA counselling from the Joint Entrance Examination – Advanced entrance exam. It is also one of the select few IITs that directly admits students from Olympiad Camps.

Admissions for the MSc programmes are done through the counselling from the IIT-JAM entrance exam, except for MSc in Cognitive Science which has its own interview and written test process for admission. Admissions for other masters and doctoral programmes are done through national entrance exams (like GATE) and may follow an interview.

== Rankings ==
IIT Gandhinagar was ranked by the National Institutional Ranking Framework (NIRF) of Indian Ministry of Education as the 36th best institution overall, 25th amongst engineering institutes and 39th for research.

University rankings

General – international
- QS (World) (2025): 801-850

General – India
- NIRF (Overall) (2024): 36

Engineering – India
- NIRF (2024): 25

== Campus ==
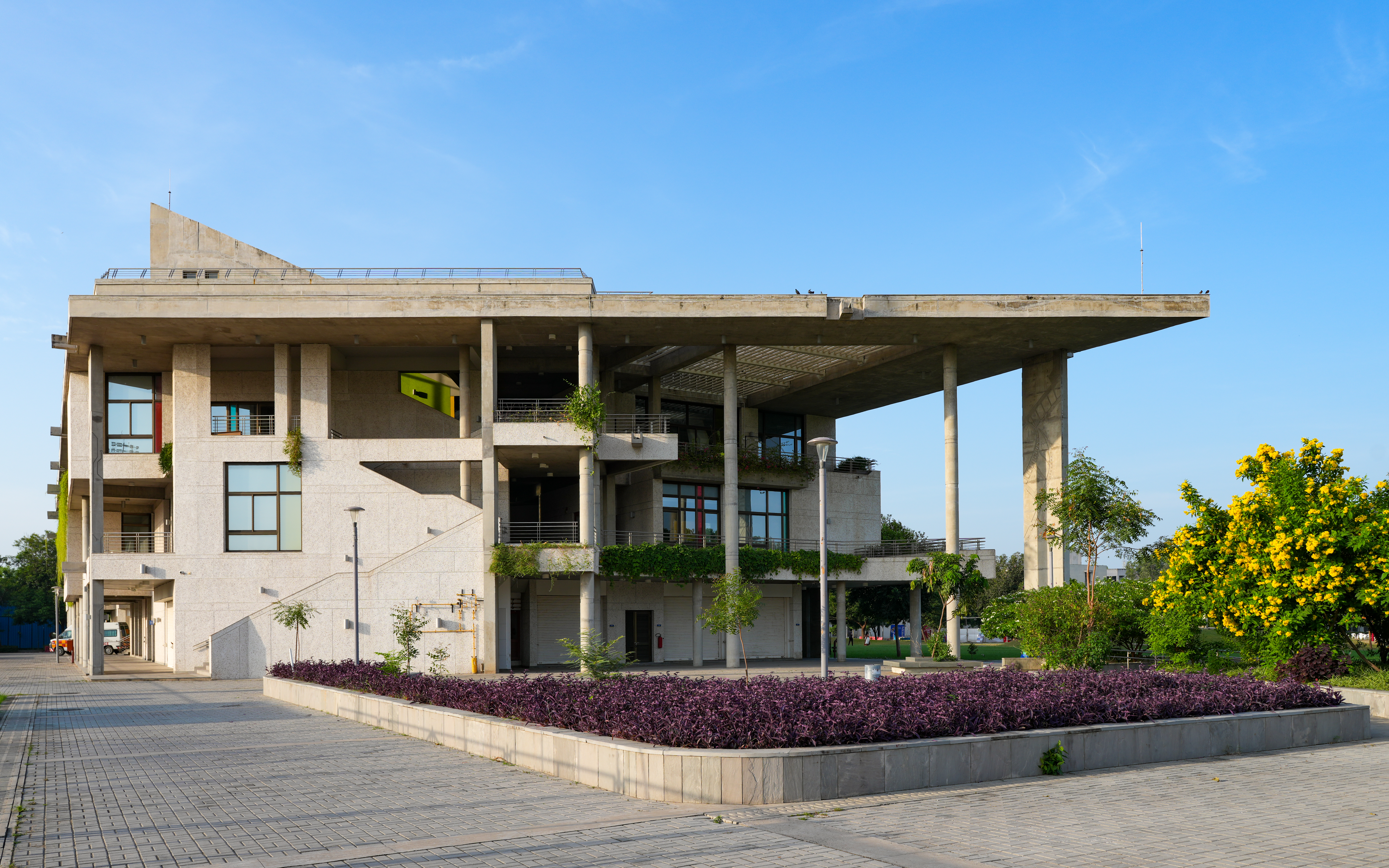
Central Arcade with student amenities

The 400-acre campus of IITGN is situated on the banks of the Sabarmati river in Palaj village. The campus has three rough divisions: Academic Block, Housing Block, and Student Hostels. This campus is India's first 5-star GRIHA LD campus for minimizing the negative effect on the environment. IITGN has also been bestowed with FSSAI's 'Eat Right Campus' with a 5-star rating and is the first (and only) academic campus to be declared so.

The campus features modern academic buildings, twelve hostel blocks for undergraduate and postgraduate students, two central dining facilities, sports complexes (including football, hockey, cricket, volleyball, and basketball fields), a gymnasium, rooftop open-air theatres, two natural lakes, a swimming pool and a Central Library. Hostel accommodations include spacious single and double-seated rooms, common reading areas, and access to basic amenities like laundry and general stores within the hostel premises.

=== Campus photos ===
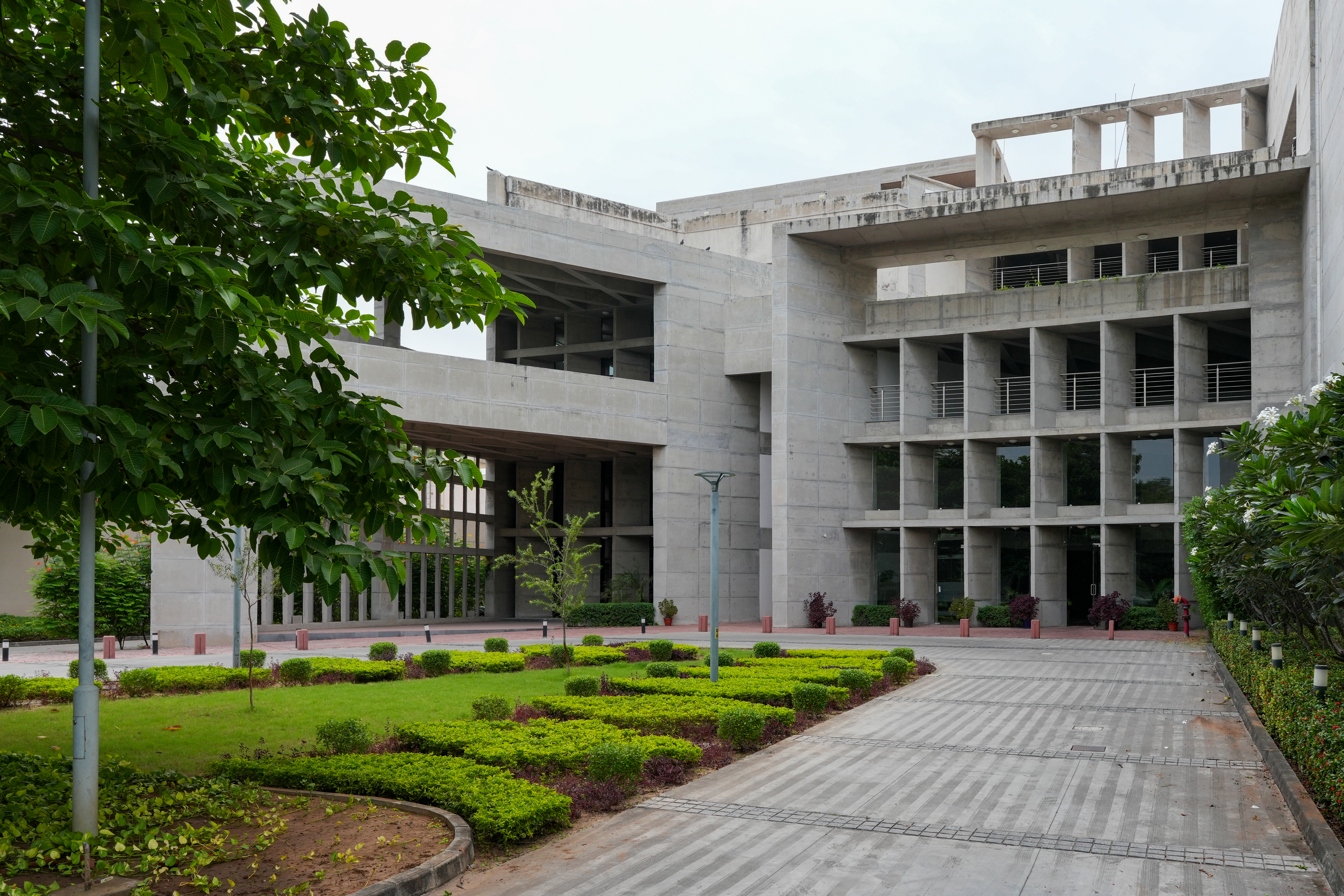
Entrance to the Guest House

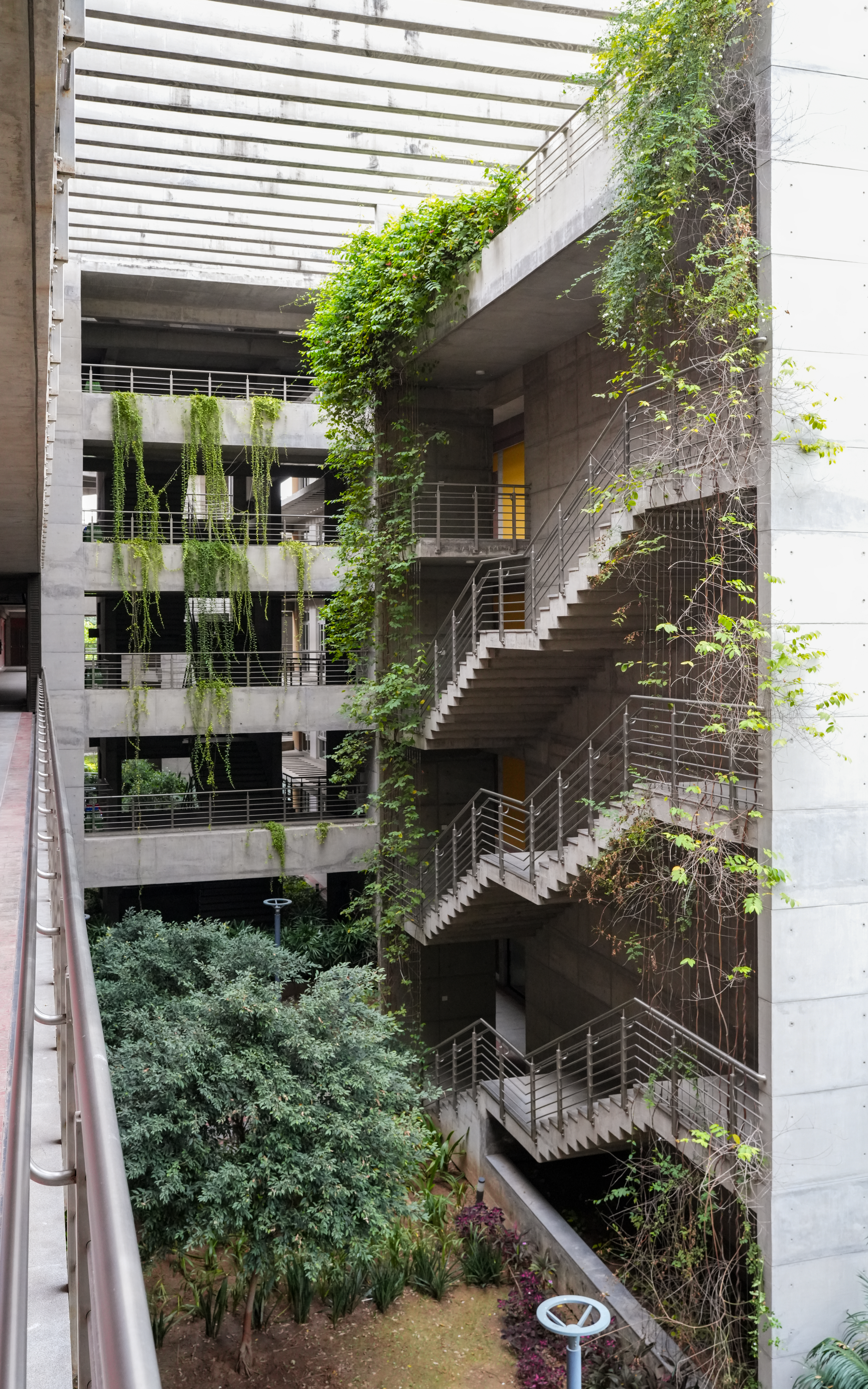
Interior of the Guest House

Breakfast in the student mess (2024)

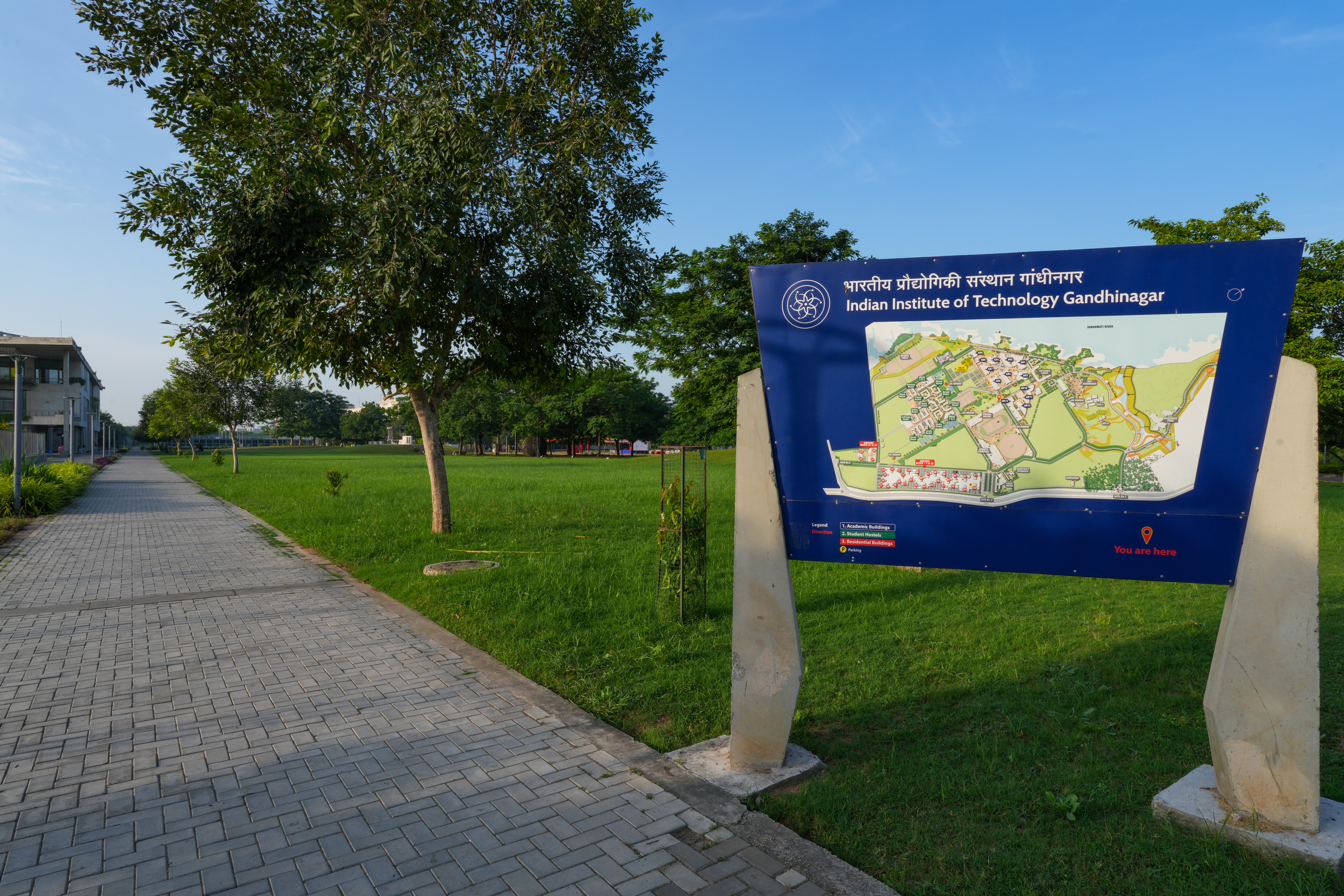
Central Vista right of path

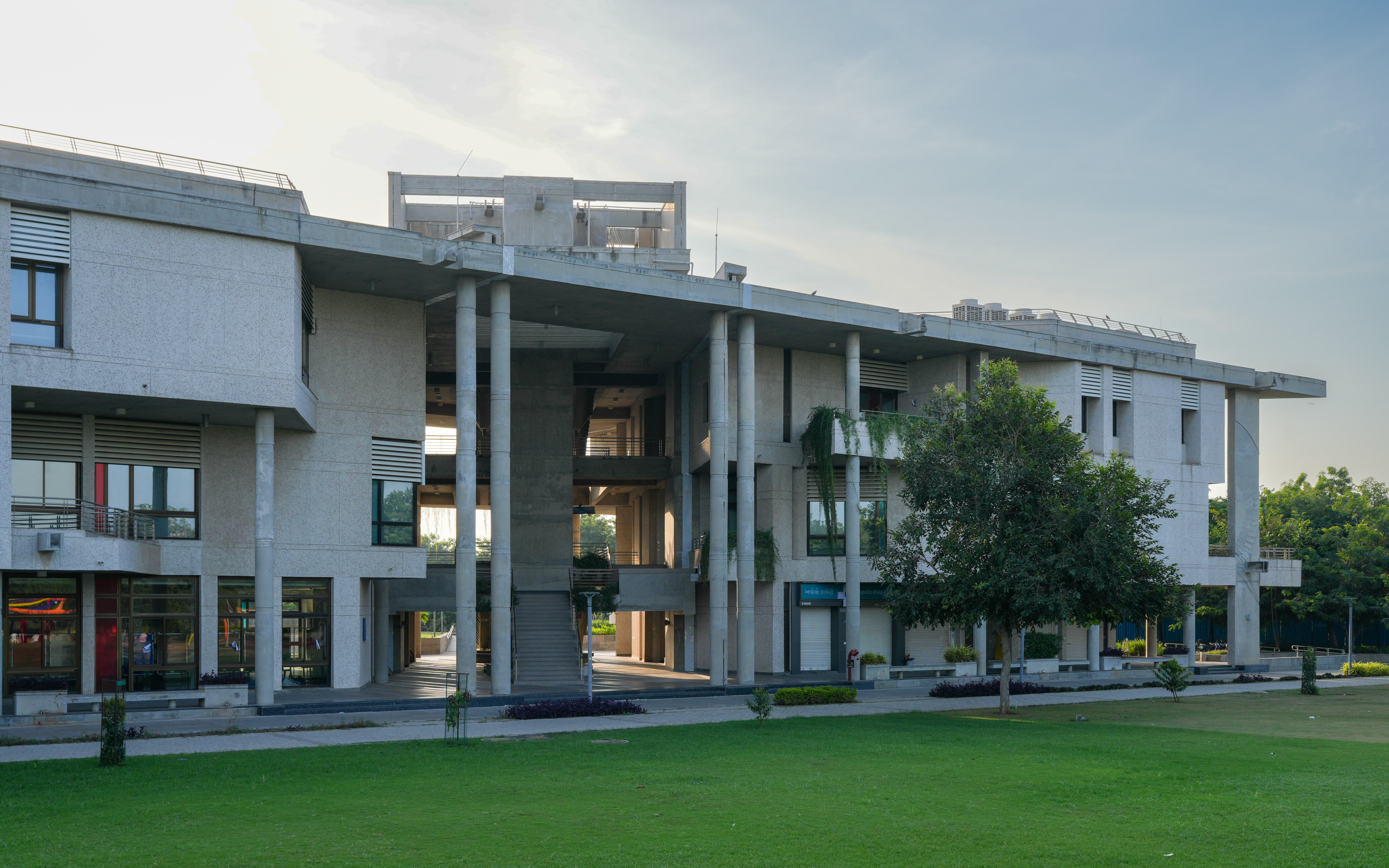
West facade, Central Arcade amenities building

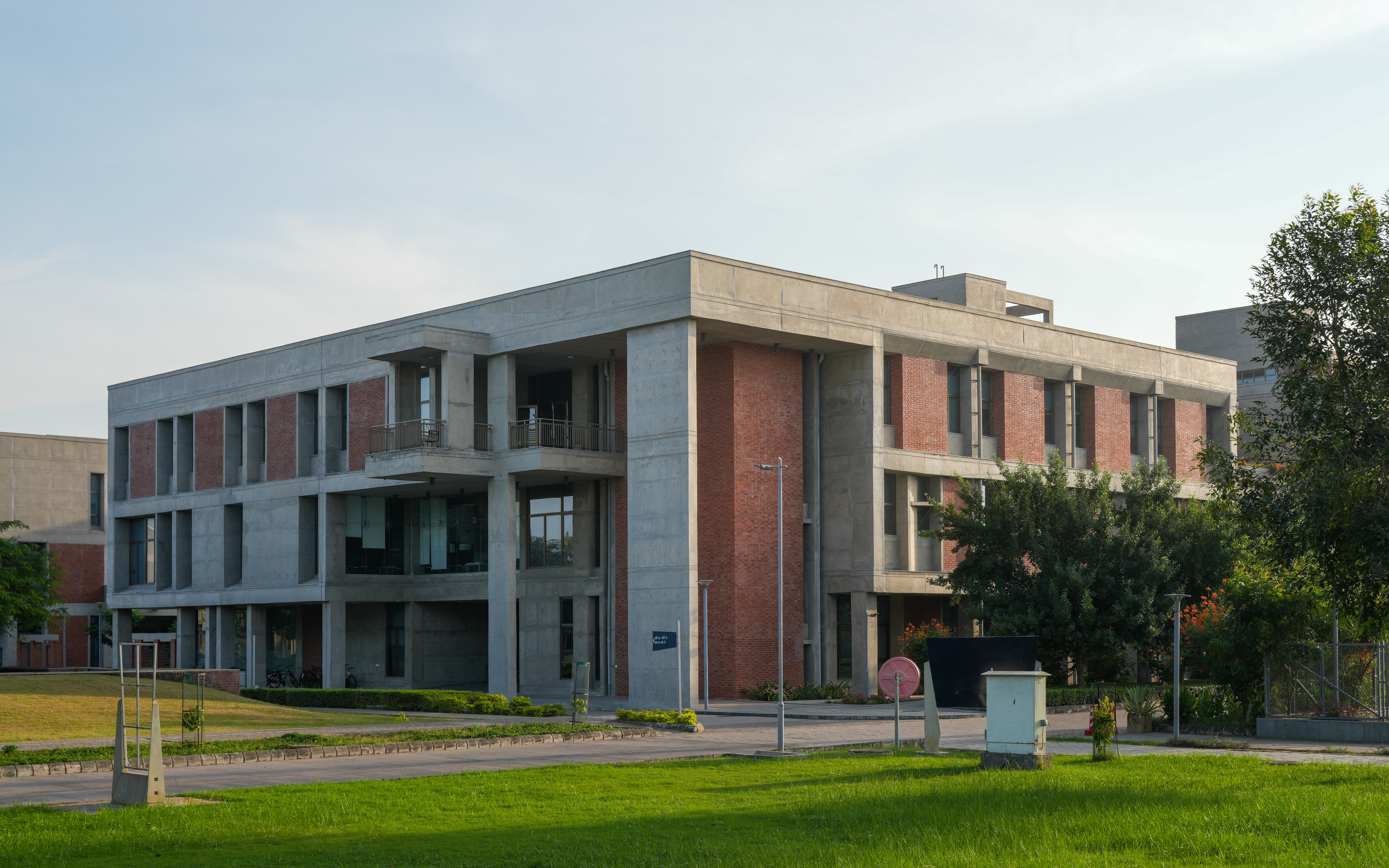
Academic Block AB-13

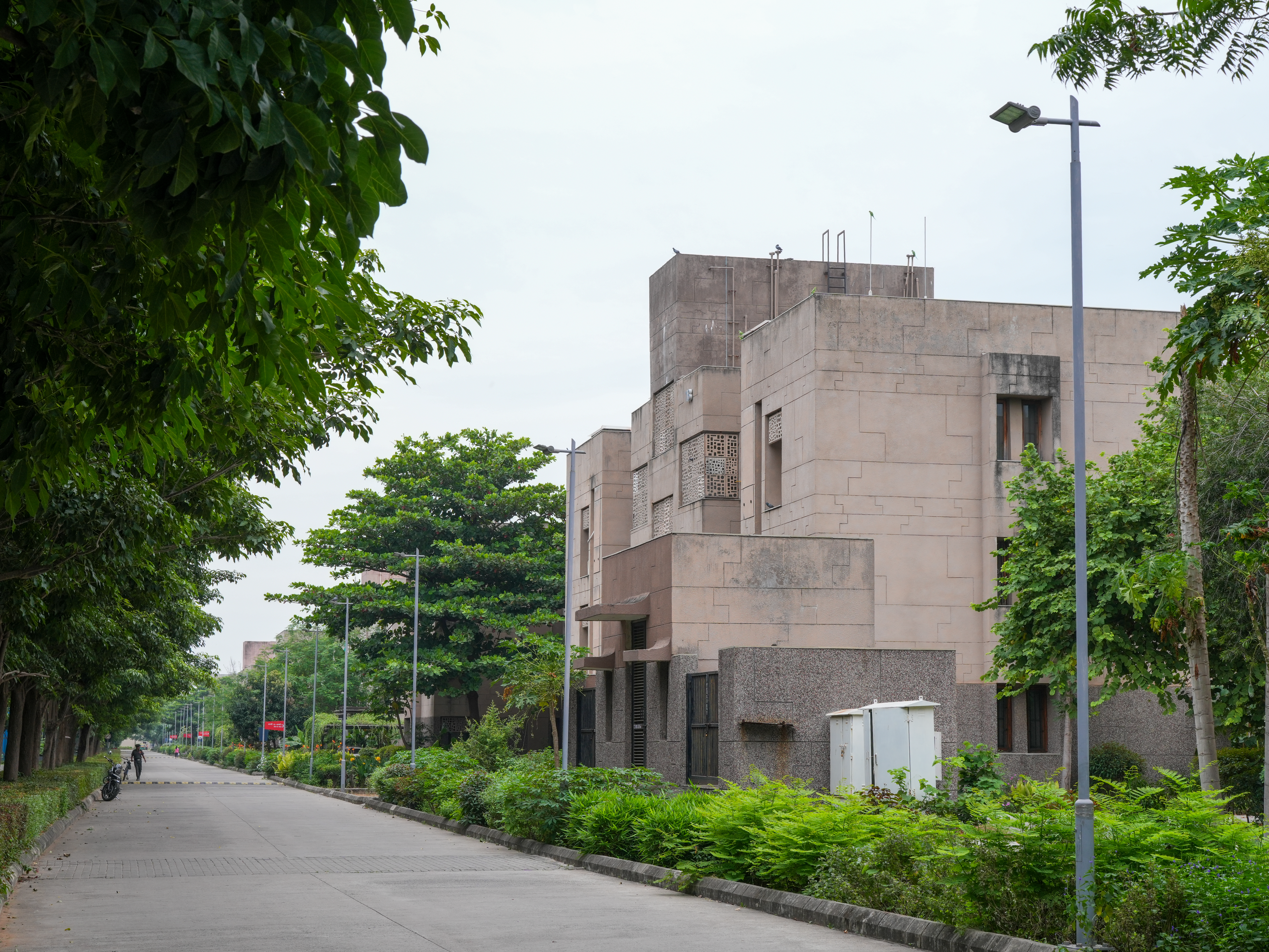
Tree-lined road in the residential area

== See also ==
- Indian Institutes of Technology
- IIT Bombay
