= IIT Hyderabad =

Research institute in Hyderabad, India

Indian Institute of Technology Hyderabad
- Motto in English: Innovating and Inventing in Technology for Humanity
- Type: Public Technical University
- Established: 2008; 18 years ago
- Founders: Ministry of Education, Government of India
- Academic affiliations: AICTE; MoE; UGC
- Budget: ₹300 crore (US$31 million) (2023-2024)
- Director: Budaraju Srinivasa Murty
- Academic staff: 321
- Students: 4,475
- Undergraduates: 2,041
- Postgraduates: 1,136
- Doctoral students: 1,298
- Location: Sangareddy, Telangana, 502285, India; 17°35′46″N 78°07′31″E
- Campus: 576 acres (2.33 km^{2}); Rural
- Language: English
- Colours
- Website: IIT-Hyderabad

The Indian Institute of Technology Hyderabad (IIT- Hyderabad or IIT-H) is a public technical university located in Kandi near the Sangareddy district in the Indian state of Telangana.

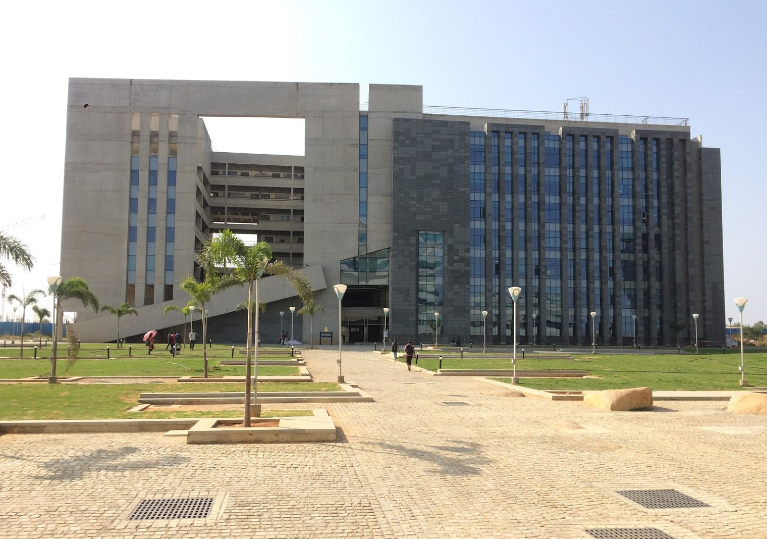
IIT Hyderabad

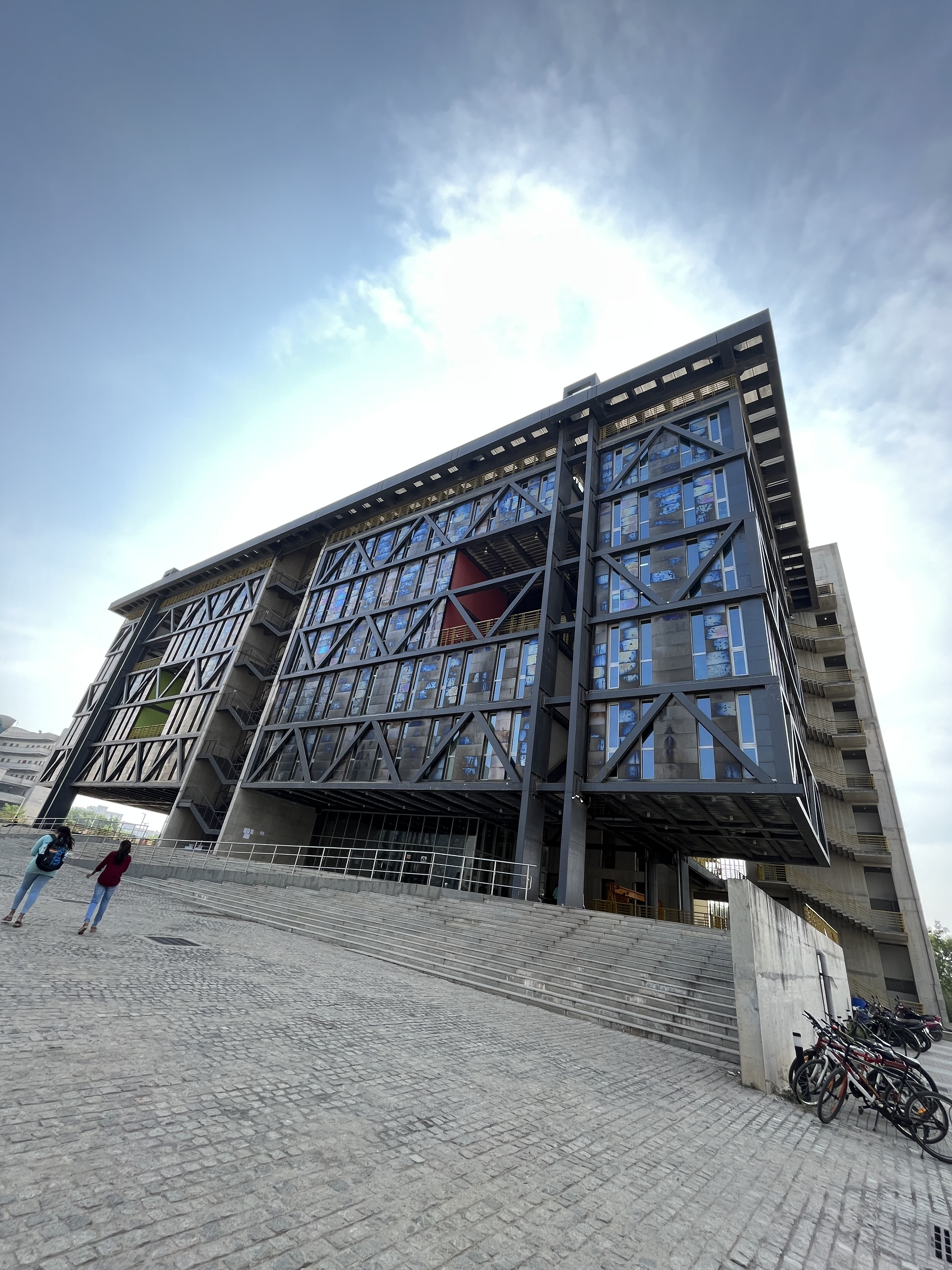
IIT Hyderabad

== History ==
IIT Hyderabad was established by the Ministry of Education, Government of India under the Institutes of Technology (Amendment) Act, 2011. The Act was passed in the Lok Sabha on 24 March 2011 and by the Rajya Sabha on 30 April 2012. It was set up in technical and financial assistance from Government of Japan.

IIT Hyderabad began functioning on 18 August 2008 from a temporary campus in Ordnance Factory Medak, with Prof. U. B. Desai as the founding director. In July 2015, it moved to its 576-acre permanent campus at Kandi, Sangareddy. At present, Prof. B.S. Murty is the Director of IIT Hyderabad. It is close to the outer ring road and located on NH-65.

== Campus ==
The IITH campus is on a land area of 576 acres (234 ha). IIT Hyderabad is around 15 km from the Outer Ring Road and is very accessible using both private and public transport. The academic building is designed by New Delhi-based ARCOP, and hostels, Lecture Hall, and academic departments by Pune-based acclaimed American architect Prof. Christopher Charles Benninger. This organic campus is divided into clusters of buildings being completed in phases starting in 2011. The campus is one of India's best examples of energy efficient, carbon neutral and sustainable architecture. The design grew out of local weather conditions and utmost care to enhance learning. The graduate and post-graduate programs are separated, student and teacher housing is divided, and girls' and boys' hostels are segregated for a pluralistic environment.

The 25 lakh square feet of buildings in Phase 1A; 3 academic blocks and 10 functioning hostel buildings (each with a capacity of 200) were completed in March 2019.

=== Hostels ===
Most dorm rooms at IIT Hyderabad are traditional one-person rooms, with some two-person rooms. Most students reside in the twenty-three hostel buildings on campus. Six out of the 23 hostel buildings accommodate female students exclusively. Dining facilities are located in centralized halls. Students are assigned specific rooms at the time of admission where they will live, usually for the remainder of their stay at the institute. First-year undergraduate students are usually allotted double sharing rooms; while the other students receive single-occupancy rooms. Students are provided with complimentary high-speed fiber optic internet for academic and personal purposes. Radiant cooled rooms adds to the comfort.

IIT Hyderabad Research Park

In 2018, the Government of India sanctioned a Research Park to some IITs in which IIT Hyderabad got its place. IIT Hyderabad Research Park is a self-reliant team endorsed by IIT Hyderabad and its alumni. The IIT Hyderabad Research Park promotes the betterment of research and development by the institute through friendship with industry, helping in the advancement of modern ventures, and economic development. The IIT Hyderabad Research Park assists organizations with a research target to set up an infrastructure in the park and take advantage of the expertise available at IIT Hyderabad.

IIT Hyderabad Technology Research Park (TRP), with a total Built-up area of 19,560 square meters, was recently (On 4 February 2022) inaugurated by Srivari Chandrasekhar, secretary, Department of Science & Technology, Government of India (GoI).

== Organisation and Administration ==
=== Governance ===
All IITs follow the same organizational structure, which has President of India at the top of the hierarchy. Directly under the President is the IIT Council. Under the IIT Council is the board of governors of each IIT. Under the board of governors is the director, who is the chief academic and executive officer of the IIT. Under the director, in the organizational structure, comes the deputy director. Under the director and the deputy director come the deans, heads of departments, and registrar; as well as the Student Gymkhana Council elected by the student community, which leads the clubs and cells across the institute.

=== Departments ===
IIT Hyderabad has 18 departments:

==== Engineering ====
- Artificial intelligence
- Biomedical engineering
- Biotechnology and Bioinformatics
- Chemical engineering
- Climate change
- Civil engineering
- Computer Science and Engineering
- Electrical Engineering
- Engineering Science
- Heritage Science and Technology
- Materials Science and Metallurgical Engineering
- Mechanical and Aerospace Engineering

==== Science ====
- Mathematics
- Physics
- Chemistry

==== Liberal Arts, Design, and Management ====
- Liberal Arts
- Design
- Entrepreneurship and Management

==== Schools and Centres ====
- Greenko School of Sustainability
- Centre for Interdisciplinary Programs
- Dr BVR Mohan Reddy School of Innovation and Entrepreneurship

=== Research and industrial consultancy ===
IIT Hyderabad has 110 laboratories on the campus, of which 50 are exclusively for research. Over 80% of the faculty has either one sponsored research project or a consulting project. There is an emphasis on innovation, with more than 7,246 research publications and patent disclosures, 1,668 sponsored/consultancy projects, and industry collaborations.

IIT Hyderabad is involved in the DISANET project for disaster mitigation, an Indo-Japanese collaboration.

IIT Hyderabad has also been involved with India's first 5G patent removing fluoride from water using naturally occurring Jamun seeds, developing a constant drug delivery system for the body through skin patch and other research projects.

=== Inter-disciplinary centres ===
- Design Innovation Centre
- Centre for Cyber-Physical Systems and IoT
- Teaching Learning Centre (TLC)
- Tinkerer's Laboratory – a variety of scientific instruments including scientific instruments, electronic components, 3D printers, CNCs, workstations, etc.

=== Incubation centers ===
- iTIC Incubator at IIT Hyderabad, with BUILD being a subset of iTIC
- Center for Healthcare Entrepreneurship
- Fabless Chip Design Incubator
- Design Innovation Centre

== Academics ==
IIT Hyderabad offers the following degrees:

=== Undergraduate Degrees ===
==== Bachelor of Technology (B.Tech.) ====
These degrees require 125-130 credits of coursework, typically over a period of 4 years. These courses include Basic Science courses, Basic Engineering courses, Liberal and Creative Arts, Free Electives, and Stream-specific core courses and electives.

- Artificial Intelligence
- Biomedical Engineering
- Biotechnology and Bioinformatics
- Chemical Engineering
- Civil Engineering
- Computer Science and Engineering
- Computational Engineering (Interdisciplinary BTech Program)
- Electrical Engineering
- Electrical Engineering (IC Design and Technology)
- Engineering Physics
- Engineering Science (Interdisciplinary BTech Program)
- Industrial Chemistry
- Materials Science and Metallurgical Engineering
- Mathematics and Computing
- Mechanical Engineering

Bachelor of Design (B.Des.)

- Design

Undergraduate Double Majors

Second majors require an additional 24 credits of coursework and the program lasts for 5 years, although completing the second major in the 4-year timeframe is allowed and is quite common.

- Chemical Engineering
- Civil Engineering
- Computer Science and Engineering
- Electrical Engineering
- Entrepreneurship
- Engineering Physics
- Mathematics and Computing
- Mechanical Engineering
- Materials Science and Metallurgical Engineering

Undergraduate Minors

Minors require an additional 12 credits of coursework.

- Aerospace Engineering
- Artificial Intelligence
- Biomedical Engineering
- Climate Change
- Creative Arts
- Chemical Engineering
- Civil Engineering
- Computer Science and Engineering
- Design
- Electrical Engineering
- Entrepreneurship
- Economics
- Mechanical Engineering
- Materials Science and Metallurgical Engineering
- Mathematics
- Physics
- Robotics

=== Postgraduate and Doctoral Degrees ===
IIT Hyderabad also offers regular M.Tech. degrees in 40 programs (including eight interdisciplinary programs), and M.Des. degrees in Design and MSc degrees in 3 programs in sciences. The institute also offers online M.Tech./M.Des. degrees in eight programs (including two interdisciplinary programs). The postgraduate programs typically last for 2–3 years with 50 credits of coursework. In 2019, the institute started offering M. A. in Development Studies. The institute also offers PhD across all disciplines of engineering, sciences, and Liberal Arts.

=== Coursework and Fractal Academics ===
Each department offers courses of various levels, for undergraduate and postgraduate students. Core/compulsory courses are floated every alternate semester, along with a basket of electives. Advanced elective courses are open for both undergraduate and postgraduate students, as well as students of other departments, although enrollment may be limited.

IIT Hyderabad uses a Fractal Academic System, involving continuous evaluation of students and more choices on subjects they want to pursue outside their core area. The structure of academics involves students taking courses to fill specific number of credits within Elective Baskets. Courses across UG and PG involve domains such as "Department Electives" where courses are taken from within the prescribed list of courses by the department, "Free Electives" where any courses of the student's choice are taken, mandatory "Liberal Arts"/"Creative Arts" credits where credits have to be taken from the Liberal Arts and/or Creative Arts department. Additional courses such as the NSS/NSO/NCC, and Clean India are required to be taken, as specified to the degree being pursued. Undergraduate students are required to complete 125-130 credits to complete their degree, with additional credits being taken for additions to the degree.

At the institute, every semester, undergraduate students have the option to take courses in Liberal Arts and Creative Arts such macroeconomics, introductory psychology, introduction to the Sanskrit, Japanese, French, or German language, introduction to Carnatic or Western classical music, veena (taught by Grammy Award Winner and Padma Bhushan Awardee Pandit Vishwa Mohan Bhatt) theater, pottery and ceramics, Indian Classical Dance, and Madhubani painting. Courses offered by industry and professionals are often floated, including Engineering courses such as PCB Design by Renesas Electronics, Creative Arts courses by seasoned artists, and "Empowering 3 billion" by Dr. A P J Abdul Kalam, ex-President of India, floated in 2012.

IIT Hyderabad currently offers expansion to the degrees by providing students opportunities to take up additional Minors, Majors and Dual Degree programs. As per the 50th Senate Academic Handbook, Dual Degrees are currently offered for B.Tech. + M.Tech.; B.Tech. + PhD; B.Tech. + M.Tech. (Interdisciplinary & Cross-Disciplinary), B.Des. + M.Des.; and B.Des. + PhD. The structure is permissible to allow ambitious students to take up additional coursework at their desired level of difficulty; for example if a B.Tech./B.Des. student wishes to graduate with a cross-disciplinary exposure, they may pursue a Major in their respective department, while pursuing an Honours in addition to another Major, or Minor, or combinations of both, and then also take up an additional degree.

=== Admission ===
Admission to B.Tech. programs is through the Joint Entrance Examination – Advanced for 595 seats. Among all the IITs, IIT Kanpur and IIT Hyderabad had all their seats taken between 2013 and 2017.

Admission to the B.Des. program is through the Undergraduate Common Entrance Examination for Design (UCEED). The B.Des. program started at IIT Hyderabad from August 2019. with 10 seats.

All qualified candidates with a valid Common Entrance Examination for Design (CEED) score become eligible to apply for M.Des. admission, students who had completed their Bachelors from eligible CFTIs / IITs are not required to have written CEED.

M.Des. (Regular), M.Des (Project) and M.Des. (Practice) are offered at the Department of Design (DoD), with M.Des. (Regular) provided under two classifications; M.Des. (Sponsored) and M.Des. (Self-Sponsored) where:

- M.Des. (sponsored) seats are fully MoE funded. A valid CEED score is required for shortlisting for Design Aptitude Test (DAT) and personal interview conducted by the Department of Design, IITH.
- M.Des. (self-sponsored) seats are self funded with no scholarship in this category. Though CEED qualification is not mandatory for this category, an online screening test determines the shortlisting for Design Aptitude Test (DAT) and personal interview.

Admission to M.Tech. programs requires a B.Tech./B.E. degree or equivalent in the respective or allied areas and possessing a Graduate Aptitude Test in Engineering (GATE) score. Admission to the MSc program requires a BSc or an equivalent degree with 65% for GE/OBC, 60% for SC/ST or equivalent in the respective or allied areas, and possessing a valid Joint Admission Test to MSc (JAM) score. Admission to the M. A. Development Studies program also requires an undergraduate degree and candidates must clear the entrance exam conducted by the institute.

Admission to the PhD Program requires either B.Tech./GATE qualification for engineering departments with a good academic background or M.Tech./GATE qualification for engineering departments or National Eligibility Test (NET) qualification for Science departments.

=== Rankings ===
In India, IIT Hyderabad was ranked 7 among engineering institutes by the National Institutional Ranking Framework in 2025 and 12 overall. IIT Hyderabad is also ranked the Top-6 institute as per NIRF (Innovation). Worldwide, IIT Hyderabad was ranked 664 in the world by the QS World University Rankings 2026 list.

== Student life ==
=== Elan & ηVision ===
Elan & ηVision is the annual techno-cultural fest of IIT Hyderabad and the largest college fest in South India. The first edition of Elan started in 2009. The fest takes place in the beginning of the year, in either January or February. IIT Hyderabad also hosted ηVision, an annual inter-institute technical festival, since 2011. Since 2016, both events have been merged into a single annual fest called Elan & ηVision. The fest attracts a footfall of around 15K spread across 400+ colleges and hosting 60+ events. The pronites are the star attractions of Elan & ηVision, drawing thousands of footfall. The previous editions of the fest have seen shows by Shirley Setia, Benny Dayal, Nikhil Chinapa, Gajendra Verma, Kailash Kher, Darshan Raval, Rave Radio, Divine (rapper), Zakir Khan (comedian), and numerous other artists. Each year the fest also promotes a social cause to bring awareness and bring about reforms. The 9th edition was graced by Vijay Deverakonda, as he promoted a social cause campaign for an eco-friendly world. The fest has also seen Ira Trivedi, Amala Akkineni, S. P. Balasubrahmanyam, Papon this year 2025 and many more for various talk shows. Elan & ηVision is a platform to showcase talents across multiple spectrums, with several events like Cryptex, FMI, Manthan, Elan-e-Jung, Breakfree, Quizzes, Robo Soccer, Enigma, Battlebots, etc.

== See also ==
- Indian Institutes of Technology
- JEE
- UCEED
- International Institute of Information Technology, Hyderabad
- List of universities in India
- List of institutions of higher education in India
- Education in India
- University Grants Commission (India)
- Ministry of Education (India)
- List of institutions of higher education in Telangana
