= Joint Entrance Examination – Advanced =

Indian academic examination

- Official logo of JEE (Advanced) 2027
- Acronym: JEE–Advanced
- Type: Computer based test (CBT)
- Administrator: 2026: IIT Roorkee; 2027: IIT Delhi; 2028: IIT Kharagpur
- Skills tested: Paper 1: Physics, Chemistry and Mathematics; Paper 2: Physics, Chemistry and Mathematics; (Both papers are compulsory)
- Purpose: Admission to undergraduate Engineering, Science and Architecture courses in 23 IITs, IISc, IIPE, RGIPT, IIST, IMU-KC
- Year started: 1961 (65 years ago)
- Duration: 2 Papers of 3 hours each (Both papers are compulsory to write); Total 6 hours a day
- Score range: -72 – 360 (as of JEE Advanced 2024)
- Score validity: 1 year (Scorecard of JEE Advanced 2026 is valid upto 31 December 2026)
- Offered: Once a year
- Restrictions on attempts: Maximum two attempts in two consecutive years
- Languages: English; Hindi
- Annual number of test takers: ▼179,694 (2026)
- Prerequisites: Candidates should be among the top 2,50,000 successful candidates (including all categories) in B.E./B.Tech. paper of JEE (Main). The percentages of various categories of candidates to be shortlisted are: 10% for GEN-EWS, 27% for OBC-NCL, 15% for SC, 7.5% for ST, and the remaining 40.5% is open for all. Within each of these five categories, 5% horizontal reservation is available for PwD candidates(For Indian nationals and candidates who have secured OCI/PIO cards before 04-03-2021).; Candidates should have been born on or after 1 October 2000. Five years age relaxation is given to SC, ST, and PwD candidates, i.e. these candidates should have been born on or after 1 October 1995.; A candidate should have appeared for the Class XII (or equivalent) examination for the first time in either 2024 or 2025 with Physics, Chemistry, and Mathematics as compulsory subjects with a minimum of 75% aggregate marks or in the top 20 percentile in their 10+2 Board Examination conducted by their respective board for General, EWS and OBC candidates.For SC, ST and PwD candidates a minimum of 65% aggregate marks(as of 2025).
- Fee: For Indian Nationals and OCI/PIO card holders (where OCI/PIO card was issued before 04-03-2021), Female Candidates (all categories) ₹1600, SC, ST, and PwD Candidates ₹1600, All Other Candidates ₹3200; Foreign Nationals & OCI/PIO card holders (where OCI/PIO card was issued on or after 04-03-2021), Candidates Residing in SAARC Countries, USD 100 and, Candidates Residing in Non-SAARC Countries, USD 200 (as of 2024)
- Used by: Qualified candidates can primarily use for admission to IITs (through JoSAA Counselling) and to IISc, IIPE, RGIPT, IIST, IMU-KC
- Qualification rate: 31.65% (2026) who qualified JEE–Advanced after qualifying JEE-Main
- Website: jeeadv.ac.in

The Joint Entrance Examination – Advanced (JEE–Advanced) is an academic competitive examination held annually in India that tests the skills and knowledge of applicants in physics, chemistry and mathematics. It serves as the second stage of the Joint Entrance Examination. It is the primary assessment for entrance to the IITs and various engineering colleges in India. It is considered to be one of the toughest examinations in the world.

It is organised by one of the seven selected Indian Institutes of Technology (IITs): IIT Roorkee, IIT Kharagpur, IIT Delhi, IIT Kanpur, IIT Bombay, IIT Madras, and IIT Guwahati, under the guidance of the Joint Admission Board (JAB) on a round-robin rotation pattern for the qualifying candidates of the Joint Entrance Examination – Main (exempted for foreign nationals and candidates who have secured OCI/PIO cards on or after 04–03–2021). The examination logistics are coordinated by seven zonal IITs, which include IIT Roorkee, IIT Bhubaneswar / IIT Kharagpur (taking turns every alternate year), IIT Delhi, IIT Kanpur, IIT Bombay, IIT Madras / IIT Hyderabad (taking turns every alternate year), and IIT Guwahati. All 23 IITs participate in setting of the paper under the JAB.

JEE–Advanced used to be the sole prerequisite for admission to the IITs' bachelor's programs before the introduction of NCET(ITEP), UCEED, online B.S. and Olympiad entries, but seats through these new media are very low.

The JEE–Advanced score is also used as a possible basis for admission by Indian applicants to non-Indian universities such as the University of Cambridge and the National University of Singapore. High school students from across India typically prepare for several years to take this exam, and a large percentage attend coaching institutes.

Each year, around 1.5 million students appear for JEE Main, with 250 thousand qualifying to take JEE Advanced for about 19 thousand seats at the IITs and IISc.

== History ==
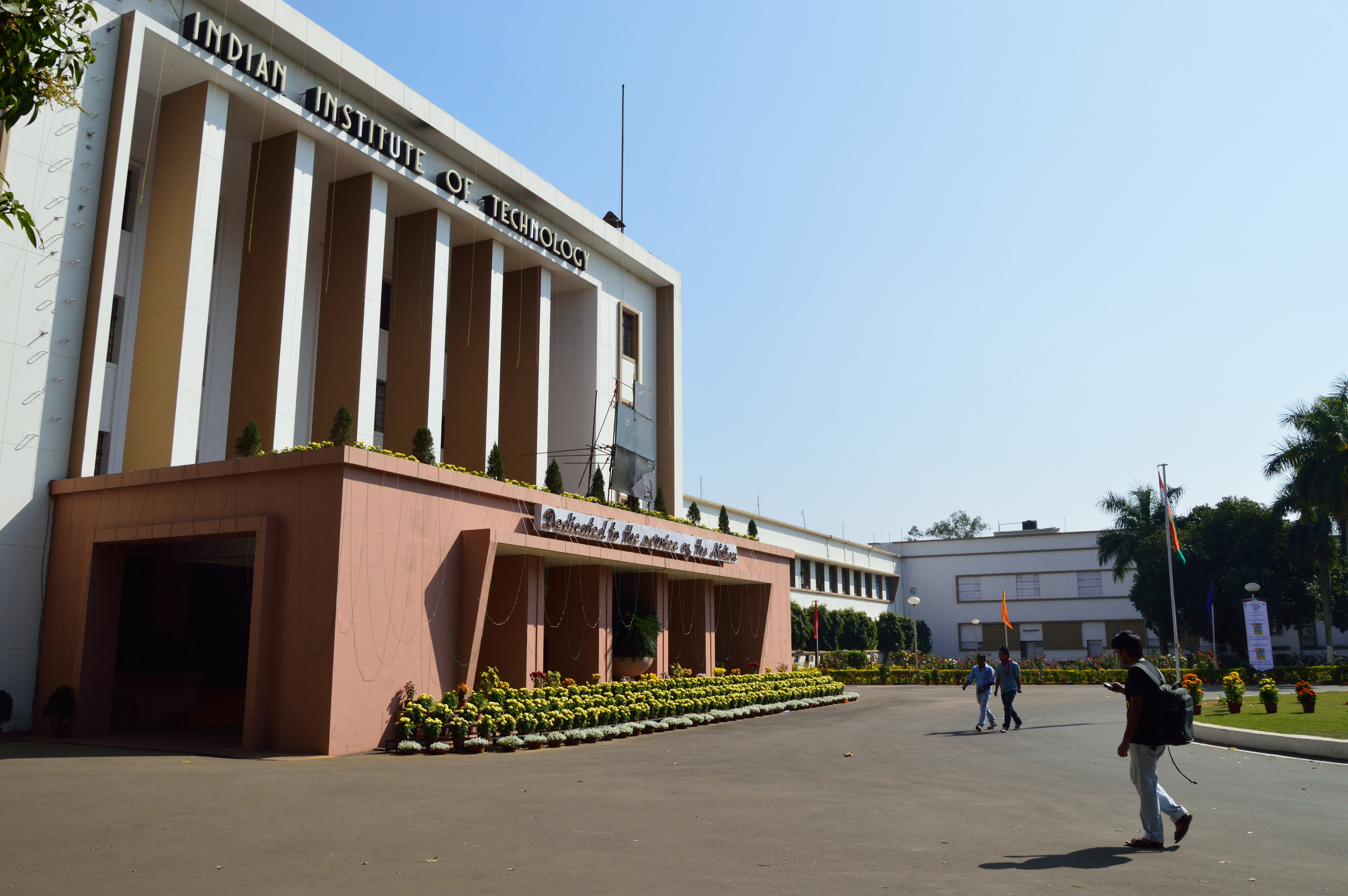
IIT Kharagpur, one of the first Institutions where students selected in IIT-JEE were admitted

Before the Indian Institutes of Technology (IITs), India had a few engineering colleges. These colleges used different ways to admit students. Some used school marks while and others had their own tests. The quality of education and the ways to get into college were not the same across India.

The Indian government wanted to make better engineers. The first institute among IITs, Indian Institute of Technology Kharagpur, started in 1951. In its initial years before 1961, students were admitted based on their academic results, followed by an interview in several locations across the country. From 1955 to 1960, admissions to Indian Institute of Technology, Kharagpur were conducted via a national examination. Academic disciplines were allotted to the students via interviews and counselling sessions held at Kharagpur.

The IIT-JEE was first conducted in 1961 as Common Entrance Exam (CEE), coinciding with the 1961 IIT Act. This was the start of a big change in how students got into IITs. The JEE had papers in Physics, Chemistry, and Mathematics. It also had a paper in English. Students from all over India took the same test.

In 1978, the English paper was not considered when ranking participants' performance in the examination. In 1988, the English test was discontinued.

In 1997, the IIT-JEE was conducted twice after the question paper was leaked in some locations.

Between 2000 and 2005, an additional screening test was used alongside the main examination, intended to reduce pressure on the main examination by allowing only about 20,000 top candidates to appear for the examination, out of more than 450,000 applicants.

In 2002, an additional exam called the AIEEE was introduced, and it was used for admissions to many institutions of national importance other than the IITs.

In June 2005, The Hindu newspaper led a campaign for reforming the IIT-JEE to eradicate the "coaching mania" and to improve gender and socio-economic diversity. Two possible solutions were proposed - either a convergence between the screening test and the All India Engineering Entrance Examination (AIEEE), or a two-tier examination, where ranks from the first tier can be used to gain admission to the NITs and other engineering colleges in the country.

In September 2005, the group of directors of all the IITs announced significant revisions to the examination. These were implemented 2006 onward. The revised examination consisted of a single objective test, replacing and abolishing the earlier two-test system with screener. In the revised examination, to be eligible for taking it, candidates in the general category had to obtain at least 60% aggregate marks in the 12th-grade examinations organized by various educational boards of India, while candidates belonging to Scheduled Castes (SC), Scheduled Tribes (ST), and Persons With Disabilities (PwD) categories needed a minimum score of 55%.

In 2008, the director and the dean of IIT Madras proposed further revisions to the examination, arguing that coaching institutes were "enabling many among the less-than-best students to crack the test and keeping girls from qualifying". They expressed concern that the present system did not allow for applicants' 12 years of schooling to have a bearing on admissions into the IITs.

In 2008, the Indian Institutes of Technology began offering their admission tests in Dubai. Annually, the number of candidates for the examination in Dubai varies between 200 and 220.

On 28 May 2012, the AIEEE was officially renamed JEE-Main, and IIT-JEE was renamed JEE–Advanced; the JEE-Main had become the screening exam for JEE–Advanced; the first test with this change was conducted in 2013.

In 2018, the JEE–Advanced exam started being conducted online.

== Qualifying percentage (As of JEE Advanced 2024) ==
Minimum percentage of marks prescribed for inclusion in the rank list in 2024
Category	Minimum percentage (%) of marks in each subject	Minimum percentage (%) of aggregate marks
Common rank list (CRL)	8.68	30.34
OBC-NCL/GEN-EWS	7.80	27.30
ST/SC/PWD	4.34	15.17
Preparatory course for SC/ST/PWD	2.5	7.58

Minimum percentage of aggregate/subject marks may be lowered subsequently considering the toughness of the paper and the need of students.

Minimum percentage of marks prescribed for inclusion in the rank list in 2022
Category	Minimum percentage (%) of marks in each subject	Minimum percentage (%) of aggregate marks
Common rank list (CRL)	4.17	15.28
OBC-NCL/GEN-EWS	4.17	13.89
ST/SC/PWD	2.50	7.78
Preparatory course for SC/ST/PWD	0.83	3.89

== Number of applicants by year ==
Year	Registered	Appeared	Qualified	%Qualified
1961	19,500	-	-	-
1978	29,477	-	-	-
1988	72,298	-	-	-
1990	79,559	-	-	-
1995	92,893	-	-	-
1997	91,279	-	-	-
1998	95,419	-	-	-
1999	112,347	-	-	-
2000	128,624	-	-	-
2001	147,775	-	-	-
2002	178,043	-	-	-
2003	178,940	-	-	-
2004	175,355	-	-	-
2005	198,059	-	-	-
2006	299,087	-	-	-
2007	251,803	243,029	7,200	2.96
2008	321,653	311,258	8,652	2.77
2009	398,264	384,977	10,035	2.60
2010	473,982	455,571	13,104	2.87
2011	485,136	468,280	13,196	2.81
2012	506,484	479,651	24,112	5.02
2013	126,749	115,971	20,834	17.96
2014	126,995	119,580	27,152	22.70
2015	124,741	117,238	26,354	22.47
2016	155,797	147,678	36,566	24.76
2017	171,814	159,540	51,040	31.99
2018	165,656	155,158	31,988	20.62
2019	174,432	161,319	38,705	23.99
2020	160,838	150,838	43,204	28.64
2021	151,193	141,699	41,862	29.54
2022	160,038	155,538	40,712	26.17
2023	189,744	180,372	43,773	24.26
2024	186,584	180,200	48,248	26.77
2025	187,223	180,422	54,378	30.14
2026	187,389	179,694	56,880	31.65

NOTE:
- (1) Qualifying to take JEE–Advanced does not mean IIT admission.
- (2) Reserved categories have lower qualifying cutoff, (e.g. GEN-EWS/OBC-NCL get 10% relaxation, SC/ST/PWD get 50% relaxation and SC/ST/PWD also get 75% relaxation for preparatory courses in IITs) who are also considered qualified and thus included in the list.
- (3) From 2013, only a certain threshold number of students from JEE-Main are allowed to appear for JEE–Advanced.

== Organizing institute ==
The JEE – Advanced exam is conducted by the seven zonal Indian Institutes of Technology (IITs): IIT Roorkee, IIT Kharagpur, IIT Delhi, IIT Kanpur, IIT Bombay, IIT Madras and IIT Guwahati on a rotating basis. This list shows the organizers of the exam in recent years.

Year	Organizer	Date
2000	IIT Delhi	
2001	IIT Kharagpur	
2002	IIT Bombay	
2003	IIT Madras	
2004	IIT Kanpur	
2005	IIT Delhi	
2006	IIT Kharagpur	
2007	IIT Bombay	
2008	IIT Roorkee	
2009	IIT Guwahati	
2010	IIT Madras	
2011	IIT Kanpur	
2012	IIT Delhi	
2013	IIT Delhi	2 June 2013
2014	IIT Kharagpur	25 May 2014
2015	IIT Bombay	24 May 2015
2016	IIT Guwahati	22 May 2016
2017	IIT Madras	21 May 2017
2018	IIT Kanpur	20 May 2018
2019	IIT Roorkee	27 May 2019
2020	IIT Delhi	27 September 2020
2021	IIT Kharagpur	3 October 2021
2022	IIT Bombay	28 August 2022
2023	IIT Guwahati	4 June 2023
2024	IIT Madras	26 May 2024
2025	IIT Kanpur	18 May 2025
2026	IIT Roorkee	17 May 2026
2027	IIT Delhi	23 May 2027

== Paper pattern ==
JEE (Advanced) is conducted in two papers of three hours each – Paper-1 and Paper-2 (both compulsory) consist of questions from three major subjects: physics, chemistry and mathematics. Unlike most of the other exams, the type, the number of questions being asked in the paper, the total marks and the marking scheme varies from year to year depending upon the organizing institute, with an average of about 32–38 questions asked from each subject across both the papers. For example, the 2021 JEE–Advanced paper had 38 questions (19 questions in Paper-1 and the next 19 in Paper-2) from each of the three subjects.

Each paper in every subject is usually divided into 3 or 4 sections featuring different question formats. Below is an illustrative guide showing examples of common problem types alongside their respective grading criteria:

Section	Problem type	Description
1	4 single-correct MCQs	+4 marks for every correct answer; 0 marks for unanswered questions; -1 mark for every wrong answer
2	3 question stems with 2 questions per stem (numerical answers with two decimal places)	+2 marks for every correct answer; 0 marks otherwise
3	6 multi-correct MCQs	+4 marks if (all) the correct option(s) is(are) chosen; +3 marks if all the options are correct but only 3 options are chosen; +2 marks if 3 or more options are correct but only 2 correct options are chosen; +1 mark if 2 or more options are correct but only 1 correct option is chosen; 0 marks if unanswered; −2 marks if at least 1 incorrect option is chosen
4	3 fill-in-the-blank questions (answers are non-negative integers)	+4 marks for a correct answer; 0 marks otherwise
5	integer answers type questions	+4 marks for a correct answer; 0 marks otherwise
6	Numerical answer based questions	+3 marks for correct answer; 0 marks otherwise

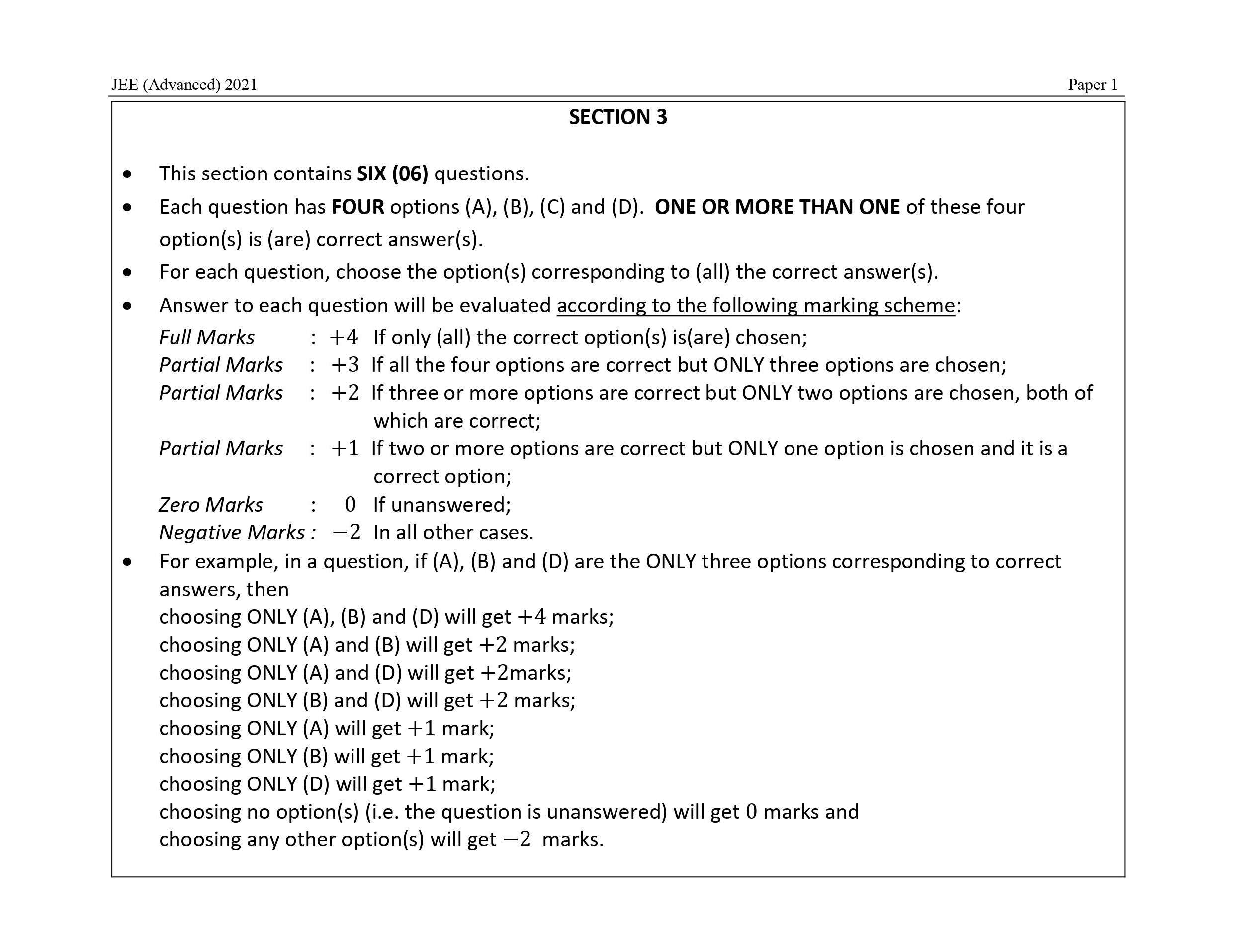
A typical instruction page of the paper mainly consists of information related to the type of question asked, here it explains the multi correct-multiple choice questions

Some previous year papers also included matrix match type questions instead of single-correct multiple choice questions.

== Syllabus ==
Since the starting of the examination in 1961, the syllabus majorly consists of topics that are taught in Indian High schools, from the curriculum of Class XI and Class XII. These include topics from mathematics, physics and chemistry (organic chemistry, inorganic chemistry and physical chemistry). A recent change in the syllabus was carried out in November 2021, when a revised syllabus was adopted for the exam, this syllabus has been implemented from 2023 onwards. A brief overview of topics asked is listed below.

=== Mathematics ===
Higher algebra (including certain topics from linear algebra), combinatorics, probability (including topics like conditional probability, law of total probability, Bayes' theorem), geometry, coordinate system (points and lines, circles, parabolas, ellipses and hyperbolas), trigonometry (including the inverse trigonometric functions), algebraic functions, exponential functions, logarithmic functions, floor function, fractional part function, signum function, even and odd functions, periodic functions, composite function, inverse functions, limits, derivative of a function, analysis of continuity and differentiability of a function, derivatives and their applications (tangents and normals to a function, angle between curves, Rolle's theorem, Mean value theorem, monotonicity of a function, and maxima and minima of a function), indefinite antiderivative of a function, definite integrals, analysis of area bounded by a curve and its axis, and differential equations.

=== Physics ===
General physics, classical Newtonian mechanics, fluid mechanics, thermodynamics, acoustics (sound and oscillation), Capacitor, electrostatics, electrodynamics or, electromagnetism (both electricity and magnetism) and electromagnetic waves, modern physics (radioactivity, nuclear physics, elementary quantum mechanics), optics (both geometrical optics and wave optics)

=== Chemistry ===
==== Physical chemistry ====
General studies of substance (moles, molarity, redox reactions, etc.), atomic structure (with concerned topics of quantum mechanics), states of matter, chemical thermodynamics and chemical kinetics, equilibrium chemistry (both chemical equilibrium and ionic equilibrium), electrochemistry, colligative properties, titrations (including acid–base and redox), surface science and nuclear chemistry.

==== Inorganic chemistry ====
Periodic properties, bonding in chemicals (including the theories of bonding i.e. valence bond theory, VSEPR theory and molecular orbital theory), coordination compounds and complexes, metallurgy, qualitative inorganic salt analysis, hydrogen, detailed studies of reactions, physical and chemical properties, along with their certain compounds of alkali metals, alkaline earth metals, boron family, carbon family, nitrogen family, oxygen family, halogens and noble gases, transition elements (including noble metals), actinides, lanthanides, types of reactions and environmental chemistry.

==== Organic chemistry ====
IUPAC nomenclature, general organic chemistry (including hybridization, hydrogen bonding, inductive effects, isomerism, resonance, aromaticity, hyperconjugation, mesomerism, carbocations and carbanions, bond cleavage including heterolysis and homolysis, stereoisomerism including enantiomers and diastereomers), organic reagents, some named reactions, detailed analysis of reaction mechanisms, the compounds and preparation of hydrocarbons, alkyl halides, carbonyl compounds (alcohols, phenols and ethers), aromatic compounds, biomolecules, carbohydrates and polymers, amines, Chemistry in everyday life and practical organic chemistry,industrial chemicals.

== Seats ==
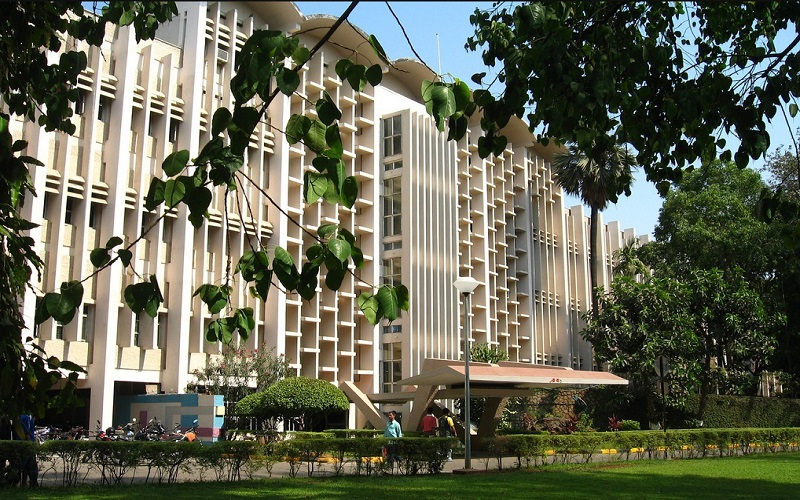
IIT Bombay is one of the most competitive institutes in India to get into and has been the first-preferred destination of high-achievers in JEE–Advanced.

The number of students taking the examination increased substantially each year with 506,484 candidates registered for JEE–Advanced- 2012. However, with the two stage JEE-Main + JEE–Advanced structure from 2013, the number of candidates in JEE–Advanced is fixed at 150 thousand students in 2013 and it is increased in subsequent years to 250 thousand as of 2022. The total seats available in each institute (Seat Matrix) is summarized in table below.

Note: This intake is only about bachelor's program intake through JEE–Advanced and it is not about intake in IITs, because some IITs also admit students through UCEED and Olympiads.

In 2011, additional courses were introduced in the IITs. IIT Tirupati and IIT Palakkad were started in 2015 and four more institutes (IIT Bhilai, IIT Dharwad, IIT Goa, and IIT Jammu) opened in 2016. In 2018, to ensure minimum female enrollment of 14%, the IITs introduced "female-only" and "gender-neutral" seats based on 2017 enrollment statistics; and "super-numerary" seats were allocated per-institute and per-course to reach a 14% target. With these, and slight overall seat increases, the total seat availability was over 12,000, including 801 "super-numerary female-only" seats. For 2019, with the partial rollout of a 10% EWS quota (without a reduction in non-reserved seats) and the increase of the female enrollment target to 17%, the total seats available went up to over 13,500, with over 1200 super-numerary female-only seats. In 2020, with the full rollout of the 10% EWS quota and a 20% female enrolment target, total available seats increased further to 16,053, with over 1500 super-numerary female-only seats.

== Exam difficulty ==
Every year, millions of students in India aspire to get into one of the Indian Institutes of Technology (IITs). "Cracking" the Joint Entrance Examination Advanced (JEE Advanced) goes along with the brand of IIT. The JEE Advanced assesses candidates’ speed, accuracy, endurance, and most importantly, their conceptual understanding of physics, chemistry, and mathematics. It usually demands one to three years of focused preparation, long study hours, and the ability to stay calm under pressure. The "180 minutes + 180 minutes, morning and evening on the same day" exam format is unique to JEE Advanced in India. A 2024 Ministry of Education committee report describes India’s current entrance testing model as "elimination-centric".

Along with the UPSC Civil Services Exam, JEE Advanced is perceived as being a relatively difficult exam in India. JEE Advanced tests deep knowledge in specific fields, while UPSC tests breadth of knowledge and maturity across many areas, making them both challenging to some in fundamentally different ways.

== Criticism ==
In 2012, Super 30 founder and mathematician Anand Kumar criticized the New Admission Norms, saying that the decision of the IITs' council to give a chance to students in the top 20% from various boards in the class 12 examinations was "a decision in haste". "This is one decision that will go against the poor, who don't have the opportunity to study in elite schools," he added.

The IIT-JEE is conducted only in English and Hindi; it has been criticized as being harder for students from places where other Indian languages, like Telugu, Tamil, Kannada, Malayalam, Urdu, Oriya, Bengali, Marathi, Assamese, or Gujarati, are more prominent. In September 2011, the Gujarat High Court acted on a Public Interest Litigation by the Gujarati Sahitya Parishad, demanding the examinations be conducted in Gujarati too. A second petition was made that October by Navsari's Sayaji Vaibhav Sarvajanik Pustakalaya Trust. Another petition was made at the Madras High Court for conducting the exam in Tamil. In the petition, it was claimed that not conducting the exam in the regional languages violates article 14 of the Constitution of India. The Pattali Makkal Katchi (PMK) party, a political party in Tamil Nadu, held a demonstration at Chennai for conducting the IIT-JEE and other national entrance exams in regional languages also, particularly Tamil in Tamil Nadu.

The PMK party filed Public Interest Litigation in the Madras High Court to conduct the IIT-JEE entrance exam in Tamil. They claimed that every year 763,000 students were completing grade 12 in Tamil Nadu, 75% of them from Tamil Medium. They had to take the entrance exam in English or Hindi, neither of which was their medium of instruction nor their mother tongue, and so were denied their fundamental right to take the entrance exam in a language familiar to them. Shiv Sena urged the MHRD to conduct the IIT-JEE and other national undergraduate entrance exams in regional languages, particularly Marathi in Maharashtra. In 2017, the Supreme Court ordered JAB to put a bar on the ongoing counseling process. There were three questions comprising a total of 11 marks that were unclear.

JEE (Advanced) has also been criticised for its notoriously tough, unpredictable paper pattern, for a high school student, the questions asked go way beyond the scope of conventional teaching in schools, this forces the students to opt for coaching classes. The coaching classes create a situation of extreme pressure for the students, gradually affecting their mental health.

== Coaching ==
Many JEE training academies conduct mock tests multiple times a week, have up to 200 students per class, and make them study for long hours, ranging from 4 to 7 hours a day, in addition to regular high school work. There were hundreds of these academies across the country, and the most famous—in Kota, Rajasthan—attracted approximately 125,000 students each year. After Kota, a new city, Sikar, has been emerging as education city for entrance exams like JEE and NEET. In the last couple of years, Sikar is giving competition to Kota and students have started seeing Sikar as alternative of Kota.

Coaching programs are major corporations, listed on the Indian stock market and also attracting billions of dollars of investment from private equity firms. The high-pressure environment at these coaching institutes has been blamed for a significant number of suicides. To mitigate this pressure, initiatives like National Level Common Entrance Examination (NLCEE) provide students with exposure visits to prestigious institutions, helping them make informed decisions and reduce stress.

== Recent modifications in the exam ==
There were several changes made to the exam in 2018. The Joint Admission Board (JAB) decided to conduct the entire exam computer-based from 2018 onwards, hoping to reduce the chances of paper leak and make logistics and evaluation easier. It said that the online exam would neutralize the problem of misprinting.

JEE(Advanced) 2020 was scheduled on 17 May 2020. However, due to the COVID-19 pandemic, the JEE-Main 2020 April attempt was postponed to September (JEE(Main) 2020 September attempt was held from 1 September 2020 to 6 September 2020). JEE(Advanced) 2020 was also postponed and was held on 27 September 2020.

A series of schedule revisions were carried out in 2021. The former Education minister of India, Ramesh Pokhriyal confirmed the dates for the exam. JEE-Main exam was slated to be conducted in eight sessions over four days—two sessions each day—for each phase, with a total of four phases being held in four different months. The first phase was organized from 23 to 28 February, while the other phases were scheduled to be organized in the subsequent months of March, April and May. The JEE–Advanced exam was scheduled to be held on 3 July 2021 but was postponed—together with the third and fourth phases of the JEE-Main examination that were to be held in the respective months of April and May—due to the COVID-19 pandemic. The third and fourth phases of the JEE-Main examinations were later held on 20 July – 3 August and 26 August – 2 September, respectively. The JEE–Advanced exam was held on 3 October 2021.

JEE–Advanced 2022 was scheduled to be held on 3 July 2022 in the usual two sessions - Morning and Afternoon (both compulsory). However, with 2022 JEE-Main being postponed from April/May to 20–29 June/21–30 July, JEE–Advanced 2022 was also postponed and subsequently held on 28 August 2022.

On 5 November 2024, it was announced by IIT Kanpur, and Joint Admission Board (JAB) that the attempts of JEE–Advanced are now increased from 2 to 3. But after about 13 days, on 18 November 2024, this decision was canceled by the Joint Admission Board, and the old criteria were reinstated. During the course of these 13 days, some students left their colleges and joined coaching institutes for JEE(Main) and JEE(Advanced) preparation. A petition was filed in the Supreme Court of India by a group of students demanding the restoration of third attempt. The Supreme Court of India granted bail to the dropouts and said that the third attempt would only be applicable to those students who dropped out between 5 November and 18 November 2024.

== See also ==
- Indian Institute of Technology (IIT)
- Graduate Aptitude Test in Engineering (GATE)
- Indian Science Engineering Eligibility Test or, Common Engineering Entrance Examination
- National Eligibility cum Entrance Test (Undergraduate) (NEET-UG)
- Common Admission Test (CAT)
- Joint Admission Test for Masters (JAM)
- Joint Entrance Examination – Main (JEE-Main)
- Joint Seat Allocation Authority (JoSAA)
- Joint Entrance Examination
- List of Engineering Entrance Exams in India
- West Bengal Joint Entrance Examination (WBJEE)
- Birla Institute of Technology and Science Admission Test (BITSAT)
- Maharashtra Health and Technical Common Entrance Test (MHT-CET)
- Consortium of Medical, Engineering and Dental Colleges of Karnataka (COMED-K)
- Gujarat Common Entrance Test (GUJCET)
- Karnataka Common Entrance Test (KCET)
- Odisha Joint Entrance Examination (OJEE)
- Rajasthan Pre-Engineering Test (RPET) / Rajasthan Engineering Admission Process (REAP)
- Indian Institutes of Science Education and Research Aptitude Test (IAT)
- National Entrance Screening Test (NEST)
- National Defence Academy and Naval Academy Examination (NDA)
- UPSC Civil Services Examination (UPSC CSE)
- List of Public service commissions in India
- Education in India
