= Joint Entrance Examination =

Indian engineering entrance assessment

- Acronym: JEE
- Type: Computer based test (CBT)
- Administrator: JEE–Main: National Testing Agency; JEE–Advanced: seven zonal IITs (IIT Roorkee, IIT Kharagpur, IIT Delhi, IIT Kanpur, IIT Bombay, IIT Madras, and IIT Guwahati)
- Skills tested: Physics, Chemistry, and Mathematics
- Purpose: JEE–Main: Admission to undergraduate engineering and architecture courses in 32 NITs, 26 IIITs, and 40 GFTIs and many State Government and Private Institutes. Also serves as a preliminary selection and eligibility test for appearing JEE–Advanced for admission to IITs; JEE–Advanced: Admission to undergraduate Engineering, Science and Architecture courses in 23 IITs, and, IMU, IIPE, RGIPT, IIST, IISc etc.
- Regions: India
- Website: JEE–Main: jeemain.nta.ac.in; JEE–Advanced: jeeadv.ac.in

The Joint Entrance Examination (JEE) is an engineering entrance assessment conducted for admission to various engineering colleges in India. It comprises two different examinations: the JEE–Main and the JEE–Advanced.

The Joint Seat Allocation Authority (JoSAA) conducts the joint admission process for a total of 23 Indian Institutes of Technology (IITs), 31 National Institutes of Technology (NITs), 25 Indian Institutes of Information Technology (IIITs) campuses and other Government Funded Technical Institutes (GFTIs) based on the rank obtained by a student in JEE–Main or JEE–Advanced, depending on the engineering college.

There are some institutes, such as the Indian Institutes of Science Education and Research (IISERs), Petroleum and Energy (IIPE), Space Science and Technology (IIST), Science (IISc), and the Rajiv Gandhi Institute of Petroleum Technology (RGIPT), which use the score obtained in the JEE–Advanced examination as the basis for admission, but are not a part of the JoSAA counselling process. Any student who takes admission to an IIT cannot appear for the JEE–Advanced examination again. Still, the same is not the case with NIT, IISc, IISERs, RGIPT, IIPE, and IIST.

== JEE–Main ==
JEE–Main is conducted by National Testing Agency (NTA). JEE Main has two papers: Paper I and Paper II. Candidates may sit in either or both. Both papers contain multiple choice questions. Paper-I is for admission to B.E./B.Tech courses and is conducted in a Computer-Based Test mode. Paper-II is for admission in B.Arch and B.Planning courses and is also conducted in Computer-Based Test mode except for one paper, the 'Drawing Test', which is conducted in Pen and Paper mode or offline mode. From January 2020 onwards, an additional Paper-III was introduced for B.Planning courses separately.

Due to the COVID-19 pandemic in 2020, JEE–Main 2021 saw changes in the paper format and the number of attempts. There were 20 single-choice questions and 10 numerical questions, out of which only five numerical questions were to be attempted. The examination employed the standard marking scheme used in previous iterations. Single-Correct Questions (SCQs) awarded four marks for each correct response, deducted one mark for each incorrect response, and granted zero marks for questions left unanswered. Numerical-answer questions followed the same marking scheme, with four marks awarded for a correct answer and a deduction of one mark for an incorrect answer. However, JEE–Main returned to the pre-pandemic format in 2025.

JEE–Main, unlike JEE–Advanced, has a fixed exam structure and is not subject to change every year. Until 2018, the JEE–Main Paper-I was three hours long and consisted of 30 questions in each of the three subjects (physics, chemistry, and maths). Four marks are awarded for correct answers, and one mark is deducted for incorrect answers. Students taking this exam are usually between 17 and 19 years old.

NTA introduced a new pattern of 25 questions per subject in January 2020, comprising 20 single-choice and five numerical-type questions. In both single-choice and numerical-type questions, four marks are awarded for correct answers and one mark is deducted for wrong answers. If the question is left unattempted, then no marks are awarded or deducted.

From 2013 to 2016, the marks obtained in the class XII school board examinations were accorded a 40% weightage in determining the JEE–Main all-India ranks.

== JEE–Advanced ==
JEE–Advanced is conducted for entry into 23 IIT's and some other equally prestigious universities including IISc Bangalore, IIST Thiruvananthapuram, Indian Institute of Petroleum and Energy (IIPE), Indian Institute of Science Education and Research (IISERs), Rajiv Gandhi Institute of Petroleum Technology (RGIPT). This exam is conducted by any one of the 7 zonal IITs every year. In 2020, the exam was conducted by IIT Delhi. In 2021, 2022, and 2023, it was conducted by IIT Kharagpur, IIT Bombay and IIT Guwahati, respectively. The top 250,000 students in JEE Main qualify to appear for JEE Advanced. In 2018, 224,000 students appeared to take the JEE–Advanced, a number that had gone up from 220,000 in 2017 and 200,000 in 2016.

== History ==
The JEE pattern has undergone many changes. Since 2012, candidates have been given paper copies of their answers, and cutoffs have been announced. This transparency was achieved after a long legal battle led by IIT Kharagpur professor Rajeev Kumar, and who was nominated for the National RTI Award 2010 for his work. Since 2013–14, JEE has changed significantly, recently adopting new online admissions and application selection procedures which were not available in earlier years.

On 28 May 2012, the government-run Central Board of Secondary Education (CBSE), which earlier conducted the AIEEE, officially announced the JEE that replaced the AIEEE and IIT-JEE. The JEE–Main, which replaced AIEEE, is for admission to National Institutes of Technology (NITs), Indian Institutes of Information Technology (IIITs), and other colleges designated as "centrally funded technical institutes" (CFTIs).

The JEE–Advanced, which replaces IIT-JEE, is only for admission to the Indian Institutes of Technology (IITs). Only students who are selected in JEE Main are eligible to appear in JEE Advanced. About 224,000 students were chosen in 2018.

In September 2013, the IIT Council approved the decision of the Joint Admission Board to continue with the two-phase JEE pattern ("Main" followed by "Advanced") for IITs in 2014. Followed by the exams, JoSAA conducts the joint admission process for a total of 23 IITs, 31 NITs, 25 IIITs and other Government Funded Technical Institutes (GFTIs).

== See also ==
- Graduate Aptitude Test in Engineering (GATE)
- SAT Reasoning Test
- ACT (test)
