= Master of Design =

Postgraduate academic master's degree

A Master of Design (MDes, M.Des. or M.Design) is a postgraduate academic master degree in the field of Design awarded by several academic institutions around the world. The degree level has different equivalencies; some MDes are equivalent to Master of Fine Arts and others to a Master of Arts or Master of Science postgraduate degree in alternative disciplines. It often follows a Bachelor of Design degree and requires around two years of study and research in design.

== Awarding institutions ==
- University of Alberta, Edmonton, Alberta, Canada awards two-year research-oriented Master of Design degrees in Industrial Design (ID) and Visual Communication Design (VCD).
- Amity University, Mumbai, India, awards a two-year Master of Design (M.Des) degree through the Amity School of Fashion Technology.
- Bezalel Academy of Arts and Design, Jerusalem, Israel, awards a M.Des. degree in Industrial Design in a two-year program.
- University of California, Berkeley, United States, awards a 17-month studio based Master of Design degree in emerging technologies and design.
- California College of the Arts (CCA), San Francisco, United States, awards a three-semester MDes degree in Interaction Design.
- Carnegie Mellon University, Pittsburgh, United States, awards two-year MDes degrees in Communication Planning and Information Design (offered jointly with the School of English), as well as interaction design, both through the School of Design. Both are terminal degrees in a two-year program.
- Central Institute of Technology, Kokrajhar, Assam, India, awards Masters of Design specializing in Multimedia and Communication Design (MCD) in a two-year programme.
- Concordia University, Montreal, Quebec, Canada, awards a Master of Design focusing on multi-disciplinarity and sustainability over a two-year program
- University of Cincinnati, Cincinnati, United States, awards a M.Des. terminal degree in a two-year program.
- Centre for Design Cranfield University, Cranfield, United Kingdom, awards an MDes in Innovation and Creativity in Industry and an MDes in Design and Innovation for Sustainability, both through the Centre for Competitive Creative Design (C4D).
- Coventry University, West Midlands, United Kingdom, awards an MDes after a 4th year of study after the 3 year Product Design BA course
- Columbus College of Art & Design, awards a two-year Master of Design degree in Integrative Design. Integrative Design offers a competitive advantage in many fields, including business, engineering, healthcare, and education.
- Design Studies Institute, Anguilla, British West Indies, awards a M.Des degree in a two-year program.
- Dhirubhai Ambani Institute of Information and Communication Technology (DAIICT), Gandhinagar, India, awards an M.Des. Communication design degree in a two-year program.
- University of Dundee, Dundee, Scotland, awards an MDes over one year of full-time study.
- Edinburgh Napier University, Edinburgh, United Kingdom, awards MDes Design with pathways in digital arts, graphic design, interaction design, interdisciplinary design, interior architecture, product design, sustainability, and urbanism. The course is taken full-time over 3 trimesters (12 months)
- Emily Carr University of Art + Design, Vancouver, British Columbia, Canada, awards a Master of Design degree that is a full-time research-oriented, two-year program in interdisciplinary design
- Glasgow School of Art, Glasgow, United Kingdom, awards Master of Design degrees in design innovation (with service design, environmental design or citizenship), communication design (graphics, illustration, photography), fashion and textiles, interior design, digital culture, and sound for moving image. Courses are taken full-time during 3 trimesters over 12 or 24 months)
- University of Gloucestershire awards a one-year (full time) or two year (part time) Master of Design degree.
- Harvard University, Harvard Graduate School of Design, Cambridge, Massachusetts, United States, awards a Master in Design Studies in a two-year program.
- Heriot-Watt University, Edinburgh, United Kingdom, awards an MDes Games Design and Development over one year of full-time study.
- Holon Institute of Technology, Holon, Israel, awards a M.Design degree in "Integrated Design" in a two-year program.
- The Hong Kong Polytechnic University, Hong Kong, awards Master of Design degree in Design Practices, Design Strategies, Interaction Design, International Design and Business Management and Urban Environments Design. These are 1-year programs taken full-time during 3 trimesters.
- The Oslo School of Architecture and Design, Oslo, Norway, awards a Master of Design degree in Service Design, Interaction Design, or Industrial Design. These are 2-year programs taken full-time during 4 semesters.
- Indian Institute of Science, Center for Product Design and Manufacturing, Bangalore, India, awards a Master of Design in Product Design and Engineering in a two-year program.
- Indian Institute of Information Technology Design and Manufacturing Kancheepuram, offers a M.Des course in Electronics, Communication and Mechanical system design.
- Indian Institute of Technology Guwahati, India, awards a M.Des degree in a two-year program.
- Indian Institute of Technology Kanpur, India, awards a M.Des degree in a two-year program.
- Industrial Design Centre of the Indian Institute of Technology Bombay, Mumbai, India, awards a Master of Design degree in Industrial Design, Visual Communication, Animation, Interaction Design, and Mobility and Vehicle Design.All programs require two years of study.
- Indian Institute of Technology Hyderabad, India, awards a M.Des degree in a two-year program.
- Indian Institute of Information Technology, Design and Manufacturing, Jabalpur, India awards a M.Des degree in Product Design, Interaction Design & Visual Communication and also PhD in Design
- Department of Design of the Indian Institute of Technology Delhi, Delhi, India offers post-graduate programs in M.Des and the admission is through CEED (Common entrance exam of design).
- Department of Design (DoD), Shiv Nadar University, Delhi (NCR), India, awards a M.Des. degree (Choice-based specialization available in Strategic Product Design, Visual Communication, User Experience Design and Information Design) in a two-year program.
- National Institute of Fashion Technology (NIFT), India, awards a two-year Master of Design (M.Des) degree across its national network, including the Srinagar center.
- IIT Institute of Design at the Illinois Institute of Technology, Chicago, United States, awards a Master of Design degree and a joint degree Master of Design/Master of Business Administration (with IIT Stuart School of Business).
- İzmir University of Economics, İzmir, Turkey, awards a Master of Design degree in Design Studies. The two-year program is offered in English.
- Massachusetts College of Art and Design offers a 2-year Master of Design degree in Innovation
- University of Nairobi, Kenya, awards a two-year research-based Master of Design degree through the School of the Arts and Design.
- National Institute of Design (NID), offers a 2.5 years M.Des course in Product Design, Furniture Design, Graphic Design, Animation Film Design, Film & Video Communication Design, Exhibition Design, Textile Design, Toy & Game Design, Photography Design, Apparel Design, Transportation Design, Lifestyle Accessory Design, New Media Design, Information Design, Interaction Design, Retail Experience Design, Universal Design, Digital Game Design from its three campuses at Ahmedabad (Main campus), Bangalore (R&D campus) and Gandhinagar (PG campus), India.
- National Institute of Fashion Technology, New Delhi, India, offers Master programmes in M.Des (master in design), M.F.M. (Master in Fashion Management) M. FTech. (Master in Fashion Technology)
- NSCAD University, Halifax, Nova Scotia, Canada, awards a Master of Design following three semesters or one calendar year of study, requiring graduates to propose and complete a final research project.
- Ontario College of Art & Design University, Toronto, Ontario, Canada, awards MDes degrees in Strategic Foresight and Innovation; Digital Futures; Inclusive Design; Interdisciplinary Master's in Art, Media and Design; and, Design for Health as two-year programs.
- PUC-Rio, Rio de Janeiro, Brazil, awards a Master of Design degree in a two-year program.
- Ravensbourne College of Design and Communication, London, United Kingdom, awards a Master of Design degree specializing in either Design management, Service Design, or Luxury Brand Management, in a one-year program (full-time) or two years (part-time).
- Rhode Island School of Design, Providence, RI, offers a 2+ year program focused in Adaptive Reuse Architecture.
- The Robert Gordon University, Aberdeen, Scotland, awards a Master of Design degree in Contextualised Practice in a one-year program (full-time) or two years (part-time).
- Royal Academy of Art, The Hague, Netherlands, awards a Master of Design degree specializing in Type design and Interior Architecture, in a one-year program.
- RMIT University, Melbourne, Australia, awards a Master of Design degree specializing in Communication Design, in a one and a half year program.
- Sandberg Instituut, Amsterdam, The Netherlands, awards a Master of Design degree in a two-year program.
- School of the Art Institute of Chicago, Chicago, United States, awards a MDes in Designed Objects and a MDes in Fashion, body, and Garment, both in two-year programs.
- Universidad Iberoamericana, Tijuana, Mexico awards a Master in Strategic Digital Design in a two-year program.
- University of Illinois at Chicago, Chicago, United States, awards a Master of Design in Graphic Design and Industrial Design, both in two-year programs.
- Universidad de Palermo, Buenos Aires, Argentina awards a Master in Design Management in a two-year program (part-time).
- University of Michigan, Stamps School of Art & Design, Ann Arbor, United States, awards a MDes degree in Integrative Design in a two-year program.
- Shenkar College, Israel, Program of master's degree in design.
- School of Design Studies – UPES Dehradun, Dehradun, India, offers M.Des degrees in Industrial Design, Product Design, Interior Design, and Transportation Design.
- University of Washington, Seattle, United States, awards a Master of Design degree in a two-year program.
- York University, Toronto, Ontario, Canada, awards an M.Des. terminal degree in a two-year program.

== Undergraduate studies ==
Some European institutions award an undergraduate MDes degree. Like all European master degrees, this usually requires a four-year program with a research project or dissertation.

- Coventry University, Coventry, UK, awards MDes in various Industrial Design courses including Transport and Automotive design, in four-year programs.
- University of Leeds, Leeds, UK, awards a Master of Design degree specializing in Product Design, in a 4-year undergraduate program. Students are awarded a BDes after 3 years and can continue to a 4th year after which they receive a MDes.
- De Montfort University, Leicester, UK, awards a Master of Design degree specialising in Design Products, in a 4-year undergraduate program. It also offers part-time study opportunity to complete in 7 years. Students are awarded a MDes. after the successful completion of the programme.
