= UCEED =

Exam conducted by the Indian Institute of Technology Bombay

Undergraduate Common Entrance Examination for Design
- Official Logo of UCEED 2025
- Acronym: UCEED
- Administrator: Indian Institute of Technology Bombay on behalf of Ministry of Human Resource Development, Government of India
- Purpose: Admission to undergraduate design programs (B.Des)
- Year started: 2015 (11 years ago)
- Duration: 3 hours
- Offered: Once a year
- Languages: English
- Annual number of test takers: ▲13,549 (2023)
- Website: https://www.uceed.iitb.ac.in/2025/

The Undergraduate Common Entrance Examination for Design (UCEED) is a national-level entrance exam conducted annually by the Indian Institute of Technology Bombay (IIT Bombay). The exam is designed to assess the aptitude and skills of candidates seeking admission to undergraduate design programs (B.Des) at premier institutes in India, including IIT Bombay, IIT Guwahati, IIT Delhi, IIT Roorkee, IIT Hyderabad, and IIITDM Jabalpur.

== History ==
UCEED was first introduced in 2015 as a standardized entrance examination for aspiring design students. Over the years, it has gained prominence as one of the key exams for undergraduate design education in India. The exam is organized by IIT Bombay under the guidance of the UCEED-CEED Implementation Committee.

== Eligibility criteria ==
Candidates who have passed the qualifying examination (Class XII or equivalent) in any stream (Science, Commerce, or Arts & Humanities) are eligible to appear for UCEED. There is an age limit for candidates, which is different for general and reserved categories. Candidates can attempt UCEED a maximum of two times in consecutive years.

== Exam structure ==
UCEED is a computer-based test that evaluates candidates on various aspects such as:

- Visualization and Spatial Ability: Assessing the understanding of practical and conceptual aspects of design and drawing.
- Observation and Design Sensitivity: Gauging the ability to observe and respond to the details, context, and the subtle differences in visual properties.
- Environmental and Social Awareness: Testing the knowledge of general awareness of environmental factors and the impact of design on society.
- Analytical and Logical Reasoning: Evaluating the candidates' capacity to analyze and logically interpret data and situations.
- Language and Creativity: Understanding of English language proficiency and creative writing skills.

The exam is divided into three sections:

- NAT (Numerical Answer Type): No options are provided. The answer is a number that needs to be entered using a virtual keyboard.
- MSQ (Multiple Select Questions): More than one correct answer needs to be selected from the options provided.
- MCQ (Multiple Choice Questions): Only one correct answer needs to be selected from the given options.

== Participating institutes ==
The following institutes accept UCEED scores for admission to their B.Des programs:

- IIT Bombay
- IIT Guwahati
- IIT Delhi
- IIT Roorkee
- IIT Hyderabad
- IIITDM Jabalpur

In addition to these institutes, several other institutes and universities also accept UCEED scores for admission to their design programs.These institutions, known as result-sharing institutes, require candidates to apply directly to them for admission. The list of such institutes includes:

- Alliance University, Bengaluru
- Anant National University, Ahmedabad
- BITS Design School
- CEPT University, Ahmedabad
- CMR University, Bengaluru
- Delhi Technological University, Delhi
- Department of Design, Netaji Subhas University of Technology (NSUT), New Delhi
- Department of Design, Shiv Nadar IoE, Delhi NCR
- Dr D Y Patil School of Design, Pune
- Dr Vishwanath Karad MIT World Peace University, Pune
- FLAME University, Pune
- Footwear Design and Development Institute - Govt. of India
- GLS University, Gujarat
- Indraprastha Institute of Information Technology, Delhi
- Institute of Design, Nirma University, Ahmedabad
- Jain University (Deemed-to-be-University), Bangalore
- JK Lakshmipat University, Jaipur
- JS Institute of Design, New Delhi
- Lovely Professional University, Phagwara
- Mahindra University, Hyderabad
- Manipal Academy of Higher Education (MAHE), Manipal
- MIT ID Indore - Avantika University
- MIT Vishwaprayag University, Solapur
- MODY University of Science and Technology, Rajasthan
- Navrachana University, Gujarat
- Nitte (Deemed to be University), Bengaluru
- O.P. Jindal Global University, Sonipat
- RV University, Bengaluru
- School of Creativity, Rishihood University
- Shri Mata Vaishno Devi University, Katra
- Sister Nivedita University, Kolkata
- Somaiya School of Design, Somaiya Vidyavihar University, Mumbai
- Srishti Manipal Institute of Art, Design and Technology, Bengaluru
- U. P. Institute of Design, Noida
- VIT School of Design (V-SIGN), Vellore Institute of Technology, Vellore

== See also ==
- IIT Bombay
- Industrial Design Centre
