= List of Engineering Entrance Exams in India =

There are several engineering entrance examinations in India. The list includes the UG level and PG level engineering entrance examinations.

According to the latest updates, admission to Goa engineering colleges will be made through JEE Main exam.

- Joint Entrance Examination - Main (JEE-Main or, AIEEE)
- Joint Entrance Examination - Advanced (JEE Advanced or, IIT-JEE)
- Graduate Aptitude Test in Engineering (GATE)
- Common University Entrance Test (CUET)
- Assam Common Entrance Examination (CEE)
- Birla Institute of Technology and Science Admission Test (BITSAT)
- Chhattisgarh Pre-Engineering Test (CGPET)
- West Bengal Joint Entrance Examination (WBJEE)
- Odisha Joint Entrance Examination (OJEE) - Uses JEE Main Scores
- Maharashtra Health and Technical Common Entrance Test (MHT-CET)
- Rajasthan Engineering Admission Process (REAP) - Uses JEE Main Scores
- Tamil Nadu Engineering Admissions
- DTE - Madhya Pradesh - Uses JEE Main Scores
- Bihar BCECE Board - Under Graduate Engineering Admission Counselling - Uses JEE Main Scores
- Jharkhand JCECE Board - Uses JEE Main Scores
- UP UPTAC - Uses JEE Main Scores
- Consortium of Medical, Engineering and Dental Colleges of Karnataka(COMED-K)
- Gujarat Common Entrance Test (GUJCET)
- Karnataka Common Entrance Test (KCET)
- Engineering Agricultural and Medical Common Entrance Test - Andhra Pradesh and Telangana
- Kerala Engineering Agricultural Medical
- DTE Goa - Uses JEE Main Scores
- Haryana - HSTAS - Uses JEE Main Scores
- Punjab - COO - IKG Punjab Technical University- Uses JEE Main Scores
- Himachal Pradesh - HPCET - HP Technical University
- Uttarakhand - UK Engineering Admissions - Uses JEE Main Scores
- Jammu and Kashmir - JKBOPEE - Common Entrance Test

Deemed Universities conduct their own entrances like VITEEE, VITMEE by Vellore Institute of Technology, AEEE by Amrita Schools of Engineering, MET by Manipal, etc.

Besides these exams, there is also a proposal for Common engineering entrance examination.
