= Common Entrance Examination for Design =

Indian post-graduate exam

- Official logo of CEED 2025
- Acronym: CEED
- Administrator: Industrial Design Centre, Indian Institute of Technology Bombay on behalf of Ministry of Human Resource Development, Government of India
- Purpose: Admission to Postgraduate various design programs (M.Des) and doctoral various design programs (PhD)
- Languages: English
- Website: Official website

The Common Entrance Examination for Design (CEED) is a joint entrance exam for post-graduate studies in the field of technological design. The exams are held annually at all Indian Institutes of Technology (IITs) and Indian Institute of Science (IISc). The examination is hosted by the Industrial Design Centre, Indian Institute of Technology Bombay on behalf of Ministry of Human Resource Development, Government of India.

The CEED is a descriptive test covering a student's logical, creative, observation and drawing skills, tested in particular for admission to various design courses in the fields of product design, industrial design, visual communication, animation graphics, vehicle design and mobility.

There is also the Undergraduate Common Entrance Examination for Design, or UCEED, with different qualifications to take the exam.

== Test purview ==
In analyzing the design capabilities of candidates, as of 2023, it evaluates "visual perception, drawing skills, reasoning, creativity, and communication." As of 2023, among applicable IITs were: IIT Delhi, IIT Bombay, IIT Guwahati, IIT Hyderabad, IIT Kanpur, and IIT Roorkee.

There is also the UCEED, or Undergraduate Common Entrance Examination for Design, with different qualifications to take the exam. For 2023, the CEED 2023 and UCEED 2023 exams were held on January 22.

== Eligibility ==
The eligibility criteria to appear for the CEED is a graduate degree (10,+1,+2). However, for graduates who have completed their 3 year degree (10,+1,+2) course, all listed IITs in the CEED website have their respective eligibility mentioned as 10,+1,+2. Even if in future a student who holds 3 year UG degree but manages to get 1st All India Ranking in CEED exam, they will not be eligible for any of the design related course in IITs.

There is no bar to either the age of the candidate or the number of times a candidate can take the exam.

All qualified candidates with a valid CEED Examination score (CEED qualified candidates with UG Degree (10+2+3) not eligible for IITs and IISc) become eligible to apply for admission to various design programs under IITs and IISc. A valid CEED score does not, however, promise admission to the desired institute. Candidates are required to appear for a second test known as the Design Aptitude Test (DAT) followed by an interview prior to final selection by the respective institutes.

Though the basic eligibility criteria to appear for the CEED exam is a UG Graduation degree (10+2+3), a graduate who has completed a 3-year degree (10+2+3) course please note, all listed IITs and IISC on the CEED website have their respective eligibility mentioned as 10+2+4. Even if in future a talented design student who holds 3 year UG degree but manages to get 1st All India Ranking in the tough CEED exam, they will not be eligible for any of the design-related course offered in IITs and IISc because they are one year short in the UG graduate degree program.

All the CEED Result Sharing Institutes (private colleges) mentioned in the CEED website, in their respective websites, have mentioned joining their MDes PG program eligibility is minimum UG Degree (10+2+3) and students who have passed CEED exams and students from the open general category are eligible to join their design program.

== Examination pattern ==
From 2013, CEED has changed its examination pattern. Now the examination is conducted in three stages: Part A, Part B, and an interview.

Part A is a preliminary screening test. There are about 50 questions in this part having negative marking. Correct answers carry +2.0 marks and wrong answers carry -0.5 marks (negative). Each question in this part checks general knowledge and awareness. Part B is evaluated for those candidates who are short listed in the screening test (Part A). Each question in this part examines the drawing and creative skills of the candidate. The first two parts are mandatory and the interview is carried for those who clear both Part A and Part B.

Part A covers the following categories:

- Visual communication - this includes logos, signage, packaging, fonts etc.
- Animation design - includes movement observation, comic strips, visuals etc.
- Product design - covers the latest and newest products and trends, current products etc.
- Automobile design - relates to aesthetics, manufacturers and plants etc.
- Digital (applied to almost all the fields) - relates to photography, color coding, displays, printing etc.
- Observation and visualisation (basic designer skills) - something like mirroring, textures, evolution (past to present), isometrics and geometry, tessellations, shadows and more.
- Architecture - covers sculpture, monuments, materials etc.
- General awareness - includes engineering ability, materials, culture of the country, famous personalities and their works, instruments, animals etc.

Part B comprises the following categories:

- Basic and visual sketching - that might include objective, perceptive and imaginative types
- Observation, problem identification and problem solving
- Design think-ability - relates mostly to the design streams like product/industrial, interaction design and User interface design
- Visual communication design in the form of posters or logo
- Animation design in the form of comic strips, character framing etc.

Those who clear Part A and Part B are required to prepare a portfolio to produce during the interview.

CEED syllabus:

Part A:

- Visualization and Spatial Ability.
- Environmental and Social Awareness.
- Analytical and Logical Reasoning.
- Language and Creativity.
- Design Thinking and Problem Solving.
- Observation and Design Sensitivity.

Part B:

- Drawing.
- Creativity.
- Communication Skills.
- Problem Identification Skills.

== Programmes ==
A CEED qualified candidate can apply for the following programmes in designing in IIT's, IISc Bangalore, SNU and UPES:

=== Master of Design programmes (MDes, M.Des. or M.Design) ===
- IISc, Bangalore - M.Des. in Product Design and Engineering (CPDM)
- IIT Bombay - M.Des. in Industrial design, Visual Communication, Animation, Interaction Design, Mobility and Vehicle Design
- IIT Delhi - M.Des. in Industrial Design
- SPA New Delhi - M.Des. in Industrial Design
- IIT Hyderabad - M.Des. in Visual Design
- IIT Guwahati - M.Des. in Design, Electronic Product Design
- IIT Kanpur - M.Des. in Design
- IIT Roorkee - M.Des. in Industrial Design
- IIITDM Jabalpur - M.Des. in Design
- IIITDM Kancheepuram - M.Des. in Design
- MIT ID Indore - Avantika University - M.Des. in Design
- Delhi Technological University - M.Des. in Interaction Design, Visual Communication, Product Design, Transportation Design and Service Design
- Shiv Nadar University - M.Des. in Strategic Product Design, Visual Communication, User Experience Design and Information Design
- School of Design Studies - UPES Dehradun - M.Des. in Industrial design, Product Design, Interior Design, Transportation Design

=== Ph.D Programmes in Design ===
Doctoral programmes in design are provided in IISc Bangalore, IIT Bombay, IIT Hyderabad, IIT Delhi, and IIT Kanpur.

== See also ==
- UCEED
- IIT Bombay
- Industrial Design Centre
- University of Petroleum and Energy Studies
