= Dipankar Banerjee (solar physicist) =

Indian solar physicist

Dipankar Banerjee (born 1965) is an Indian solar physicist. He is a senior Professor of Solar Physics at the Indian Institute of Astrophysics (Bangalore) and currently serves as the vice chancellor of the Indian Institute of Space Science and Technology. Prior to this, he served as the director of the Aryabhatta Research Institute of Observational Sciences (ARIES).. He is currently serving as the Director of the Indian Institute of Space Science and Technology (IIST)..

== Education and early career ==
In 1987, Banerjee who was a student of Ballygunge Government High School completed a Bachelor's Degree at St. Xaviers College, Calcutta in Physics (major), Chemistry and Mathematics. In 1996 he completed his PhD "Magnetohydrodynamic phenomena in the solar atmosphere" at the Indian Institute of Astrophysics (Bangalore) with Prof. S.S. Hasan. Via a PPARC fellowship, he worked as a postdoctoral fellow at Armagh Observatory between 1997 and 2000 on solar atmospheric dynamics using the SOHO spacecraft. This was followed by a Fund for Scientific Research (Flanders) fellowship at the Katholic University of Leuven between 2000 and 2002. In 2004, he returned to the Indian Institute of Astrophysics (Bangalore) and was appointed as a Director of ARIES in 2019 and served till 2024. His wife, Tisha Banerjee has a PhD in Cell and molecular biology and serves as a General manager in a company.He has a daughter named Teerna Banerjee who is a PhD candidate in cell and molecular biology at University College Dublin. As well as a son named Arno Banerjee who is a masters student in Global Change: Ecosystem Science and Policy in University College Dublin and Justus-Liebig-Universität Gießen.

== Research interests ==
Banerjee's primary research interest is the dynamics of the solar atmosphere. In particular, he has focussed on the propagation of wavs through the solar chromosphere and corona, including innovations in the technique of atmospheric magnetoseismology. He has also studied space weather and the solar dynamo through long-term observations such as those provided by the 100-year synoptic data from Kodaikanal Observatory.

== Awards and honours ==
- 1997: PPARC postdoctoral fellowship
- 2002: Fund for Scientific Research (Flanders) fellowship
- 2013: Visiting professor (Capita Selecta Lecturer) at Centre for Plasma Astrophysics, K.U. Leuven
- 2015: Associate Editor for Solar Physics
- 2016: Co-I of Polarimeter on the PUNCH spacecraft
- 2017: PI of the Kodaikanal Solar Observatory data archive
- 2017: Co-I for near-UV imaging instrument (SUIT) on the Aditya-L1 mission
- 2017: Co-chair of the science working group for the Aditya-1 mission
- 2020: Editor for Frontiers Stellar and Solar Physics
