= Kulpreet Yadav =

Indian author and actor

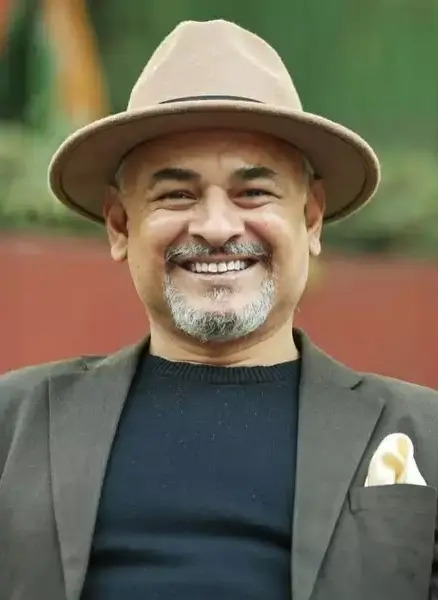
- Born: 14 January 1968 (age 58); Madras, Madras State, India
- Education: Nowrosjee Wadia College, Indian Naval Academy, Amity University
- Occupations: Novelist; screenwriter; actor
- Spouse: Seema Yadav
- Writing career
- Genres: Thriller, mystery fiction, conspiracy fiction
- Notable works: The Girl Who Loved a Pirate; The Girl Who Loved a Spy; Murder in Paharganj "In Love with Simran" "Queens Of Crime (Co-authored along with Sushant Singh)"; The Battle Of Rezang La
- Website: www.kulpreetyadav.com

Kulpreet Yadav (born 14 January 1968) is an Indian novelist, screenwriter and actor. He has authored 13 books, including The Girl Who Loved a Pirate and The Girl Who Loved a Spy.

== Early life ==
Kulpreet was born in Chennai and completed graduation in Science from Nowrosjee Wadia College, Pune. He completed his post-graduation in journalism and mass communication from Amity University, Noida in 2004 and management courses from IIM, Indore and IIM, Lucknow. He joined the Naval Officer's Academy and served for two decades. In 2007 he was awarded the director general's Commendation for professionalism and dedication to the nation. He retired voluntarily in the rank of commandant with the Indian Coast Guard in 2014.

== Personal life ==
Kulpreet lives in Delhi.

== Bibliography ==
- The Bet (Frog Books, 2006)
- A Waiting Wave (Pustak Mahal, 2011)
- India Unlimited—Stories from a Nation Caught Between Hype & Hope (Lifi Publications, 2013)
- Catching the Departed (Tara books, 2014)
- The Girl Who Loved a Pirate, Andy Karan #2 (Rumour Books, 2015)
- The Girl Who Loved a Spy, Andy Karan #1 (Rumour Books, 2016)
- Murder in Paharganj (Bloomsbury, 2017)
- In Love With Simran (Srishti Publications)
- The Last Love Letter ( Rupa Publications, 2019)
- Queens Of Crime – Co-authored along with Sushant Singh (Penguin India, 2019)
- The Darjeeling Ghost
- UNLOVED IN NUDE TOWN (Ebook)
- The City of Mirrors
- The Battle Of Rezang La
- Brahmaputra - The Ahom Son Rises 1 (Co-authored along with V. Vijayendra Prasad).

== Filmography ==
=== Films ===
Year	Title	Role	Notes
2021	Graveyard & the Madman	Antagonist	Short Film
2021	There's a Stranger in my Bedroom	-	Short film – Writer, Director & Producer
2022	Fidelity	Rakshit	Short film (sci-fi)
2022	Band Darwaze	-	Short film – Writer & Producer
TBA	The Archies (film)	Clubhouse Manager	Hindi Feature Film
2024	Kathanar - The Wild Sorcerer	Mar Abo	Malayalam film
TBA	One Last Drink	Anthony Kumar	Short film
TBA	Looser	IGP Atul Kumar	Short film

=== Web series ===
Year	Title	Role	Notes
2022	DUDE (Season 2)	CEO Nayan Kapur	Amazon MiniTv
2023	Asur (Indian web series), Season 2	Harivansh Sinha	Jio cinema 2023
2023	Badtameez Dil	Sayyed	Amazon MiniTv
TBA	Social Disconnect	Mr Parker	-

== Awards ==
- 2014 & 2016: Shortlisted for DNA-Out of Print Short fiction contest.
- 2018, Best Fiction Writer (Gurgaon Literature Festival) for "Murder In Paharganj".

== See also ==
- List of Indian writers
