= Indian Institute of Space Science and Technology =

Government-aided academic institute in Kerala, India

- Motto: vidyā sandhiḥ pravacanam sandhānam
- Motto in English: Knowledge is the treaty discourse the treaty
- Type: Deemed to be university
- Established: 14 September 2007; 19 years ago
- Accreditation: NAAC
- Budget: ₹147.50 crore (US$15 million) (2026–27)
- Chancellor: B. N. Suresh
- Vice-Chancellor: Dipankar Banerjee
- Faculty: 101 (2025)
- Students: 1,356 (2025)
- Undergraduates: 634 (2025)
- Postgraduates: 286 (2025)
- Doctoral students: 436 (2025)
- Location: Thiruvananthapuram, Kerala, India; 8°37′34″N 77°02′02″E
- Campus: Urban 120 acres (0.5 km^{2})
- Aided by: Department of Space
- Website: www.iist.ac.in

Indian Institute of Space Science and Technology (IIST) is a government-aided institute and deemed university for the study and research of space science in Thiruvananthapuram, Kerala, India. IIST was set up in 2007 by ISRO under the Department of Space, Government of India. This institute is Asia's first space university.

It was inaugurated on 14 September 2007 by G. Madhavan Nair, the then Chairman of ISRO. A. P. J. Abdul Kalam, former President of India, was the first Chancellor of IIST. IIST offers regular engineering undergraduate, postgraduate and doctorate programmes with focus on space science, technology and applications.

== History ==
Envisioned to fulfill the requirements of scientists and engineers in the Indian Space Program, by offering undergraduate and postgraduate education and research programmes in space science and technology, the institute started functioning from the Vikram Sarabhai Space Centre (VSSC) campus, Thiruvananthapuram, on 14 September 2007 with an initial investment of ₹270 crore (equivalent to ₹890 crore or US$92 million in 2026) and annual recurring cost of ₹40 crore (US$4.2 million) by the Department of Space. It is the only institute of its kind in India, which offers a BTech degree in space technology, and subjects exclusive to the arena of space science and technology. B. N. Suresh, former director of the VSSC, is the founding director of the institute.

On 14 July 2008, the Union Human Resource Development Ministry, on the advice of the University Grants Commission (UGC), conferred deemed university status, under a new category, to the institute for a period of five years. Upon request by Thiruvananthapuram MP Shashi Tharoor, the Union Government expressed its willingness to grant IIST the title of "Institution of National Importance" on 1st September 2025.

== Campus ==
At its inception, the institute started functioning at the ATF Campus, under the VSSC, Thiruvananthapuram (Trivandrum), Kerala. The campus covers 100 acres in the foothills of the Sahyadri range.

A state-of-the-art residential campus built near the Liquid Propulsion Systems Centre in Valiamala, Nedumangad, Thiruvananthapuram was inaugurated by Manmohan Singh, the then Prime Minister of India, on 25 August 2009. The institute started functioning in its new campus from 15 August 2010. The campus has an extension in the picturesque Ponmudi Hills, Thiruvananthapuram, for an observatory.

IIST Campus
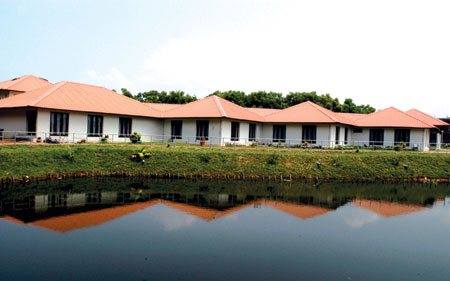
The old IIST Campus at ATF Area

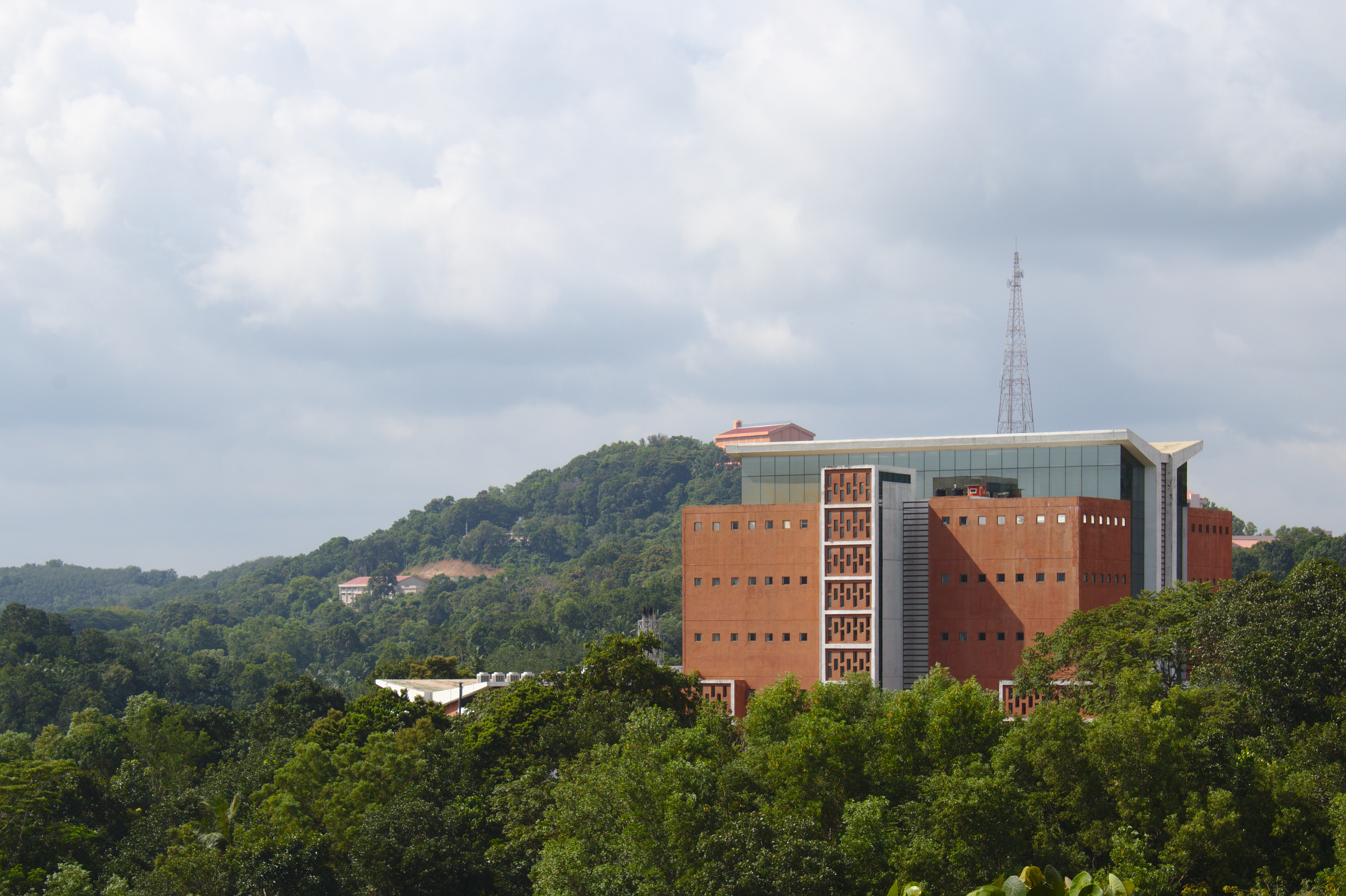
View of IIST Library

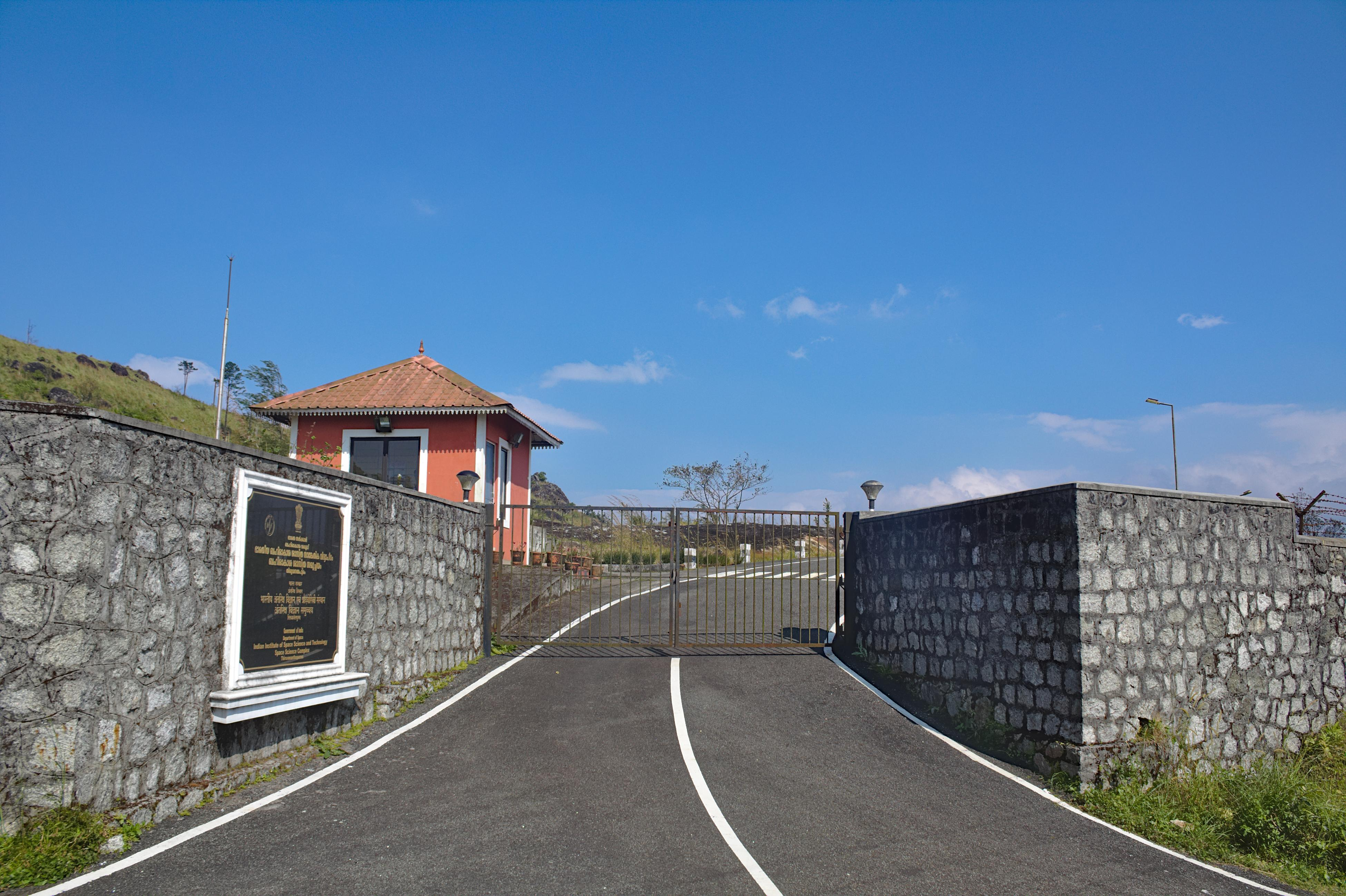
IIST at Ponmudi Hills

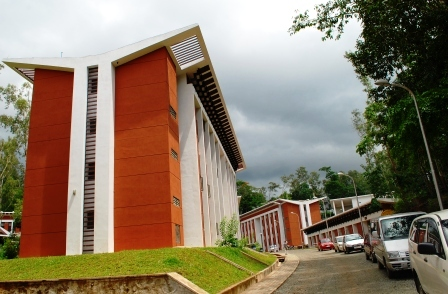
View of IIST student hostels at the Valiamala campus

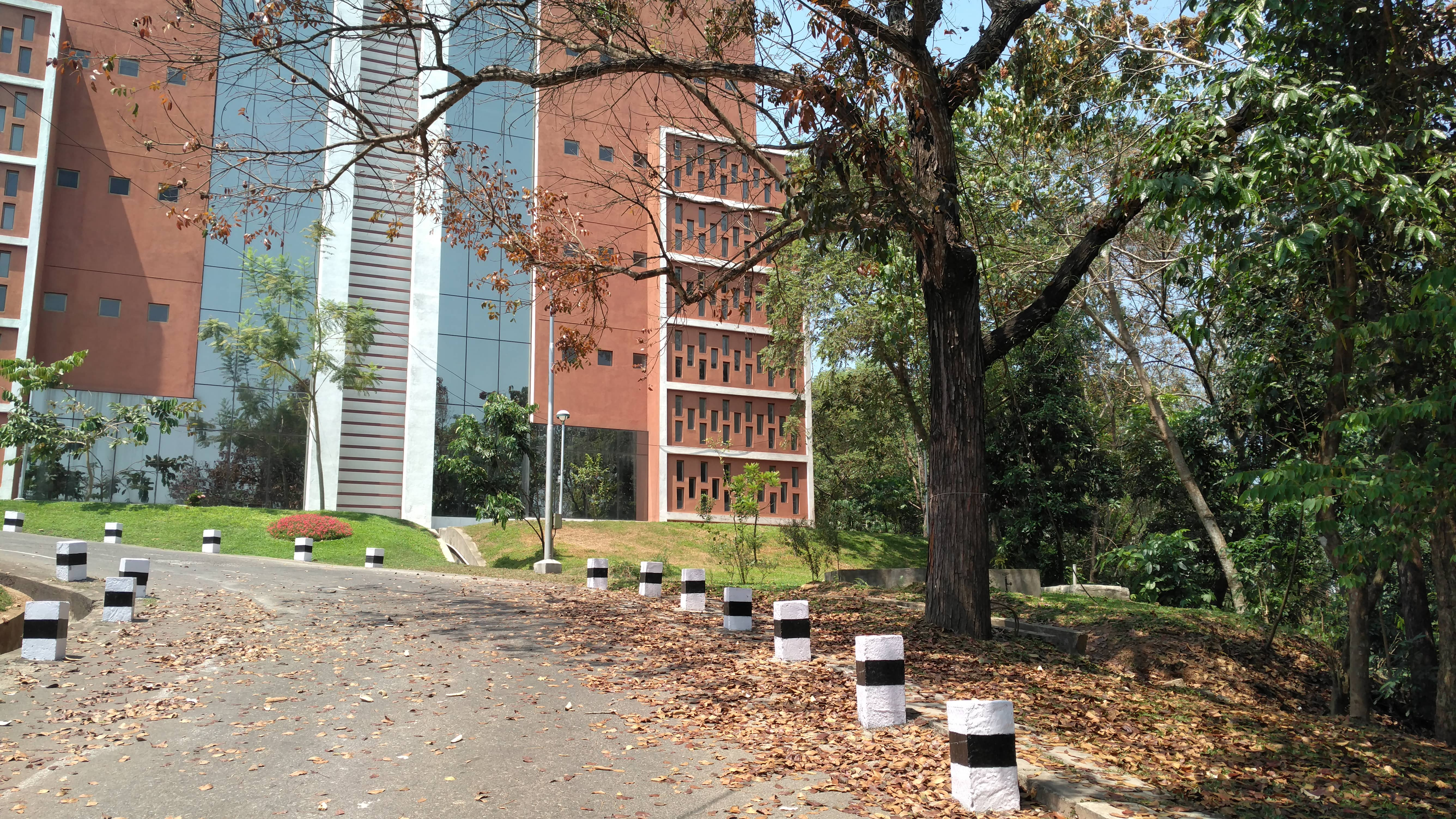
Library building as seen from the way leading to Aerospace Building.

== Academics ==
IIST offers undergraduate (BTech), master's (MTech) and PhD programs in space science and technology, and also serves as a research centre. Doctoral programs in basic sciences and post-doctoral programs are also offered. Till 2013 batch, three different courses in BTech were offered, namely BTech in Aerospace, Avionics and Physical Sciences. As of 2014 admissions, a new 5-year Dual Degree (BTech + MTech/M.S) in Engineering Physics replaced the existing Physical Sciences branch. The MTech/M.S can be done in any of the following – M.S. in Astronomy & Astrophysics, MTech in Earth System Science, MTech in Machine Learning and Computing, MTech in Geoinformatics, MTech in Aerodynamics & Flight Mechanics, MTech in Structures and Design, MTech in Thermal and Propulsion, MTech in Control Systems, MTech in Digital Signal Processing, MTech in RF and Microwave Engineering, MTech in Power Electronics, MTech in VLSI and Microsystems, MTech in Material Science and Technology, MTech in Solid State Physics and MTech in Optical Engineering. The seats are limited to 20 in the dual degree program from the existing 36 in Physical Sciences. 60 students each are admitted to the Aerospace and Avionics branches.

== Admissions ==
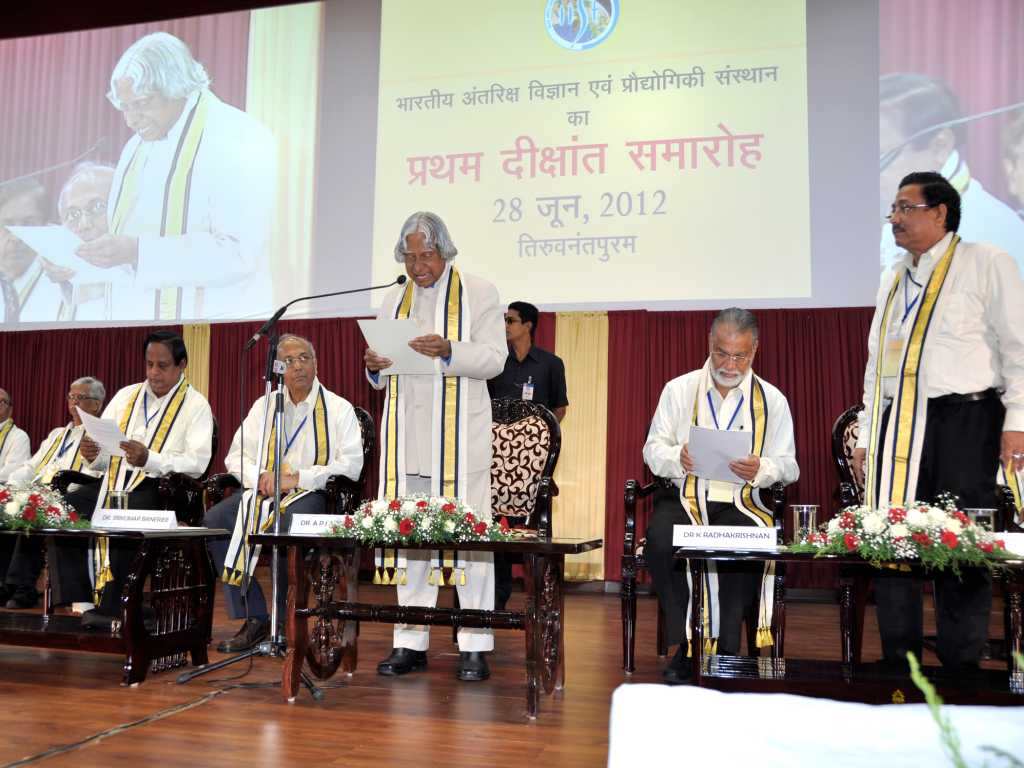
Dr.A. P. J. Abdul Kalam, Chancellor, IIST delivering the presidential address at the first convocation of IIST in 2012

The admissions to the undergraduate (BTech) programmes for 2013 to 2016 were made through the All India Rank List prepared and published by the Central Board of Secondary Education (CBSE), based on the Joint Entrance Examination (JEE) – Main. Previously, IIST admitted students through the IIT-JEE rank lists from 2007 to 2009, and conducted its own entrance exam called ISAT from 2010 to 2012. However, applicants will need to qualify the JEE Advanced exam, and marks obtained in the same will be used in determining the eligibility of the candidate IIST offers 140 seats for admission to its B.Tech. programmes in aerospace engineering, avionics and engineering physics. The BTech branch of physical sciences was replaced with a dual-degree (BTech and MTech) engineering physics branch starting from the batch which joined in 2014. Over 100,000 aspirants applied for these seats in ISAT 2012 making IIST one of the most selective institutes in India. From 2017 onwards, the admissions are based on JEE Advanced scores.

The applications for admission to MTech courses are invited directly and students are shortlisted based on undergraduate academic performance, GATE score, interview and projects undertaken by them.

== Organisation and Governance ==
The Indian Institute of Space Science and Technology, Thiruvananthapuram, is a “Deemed to be University” under Section 3 of the UGC Act, functioning autonomously under the Department of Space, Government of India. The overall governance of IIST is overseen by the Governing Council, chaired by the Chairman of the Indian Space Research Organisation (ISRO), who also serves as the Secretary of the Department of Space. The institute has a Chancellor, a largely ceremonial role currently held by B. N. Suresh. The executive academic and administrative leadership is vested in the Vice-Chancellor, a post held by Dipankar Banerjee since 14 October 2024. To assist in governance and management, the institute has established the office of Pro Vice-Chancellor, a position created in July 2025, presently held by Kuruvilla Joseph. Further, the institute is organized into various academic and administrative portfolios including Deans (for Research & Development; Academics; Student Activities, Welfare & Outreach; IPR & International Relations), a Registrar, and other statutory bodies such as the Finance Committee and Planning & Monitoring Board.

== Departments ==
=== Science ===
1. Department of Mathematics
2. Department of Physics
3. Department of Chemistry
4. Department of Earth and Space sciences

=== Technology ===
1. Department of Aerospace Engineering
2. Department of Avionics

=== Humanities ===
1. Department of Humanities and Social sciences

== Rankings ==
University rankings

Engineering – India
- NIRF (2024): 51

In the 2025 National Institutional Ranking Framework (NIRF) evaluations, the Institution successfully secured the 61st position within the Engineering category. Indian Institute of Space Science and Technology was ranked 51 by the National Institutional Ranking Framework (NIRF) engineering category 2024.

== Observatory ==
IIST also has a small observatory on campus equipped with a 14-inch Schmidt-Cassegrain telescope and an 8-inch Newtonian telescope. The telescope is housed in a dome on top of the Science academic block (also called as the D2 block). The facility is mainly used by undergraduate and postgraduate students as well as for frequent vacation-based outreach programs. The dome is powered by two sets of solar panels with necessary back-up power.

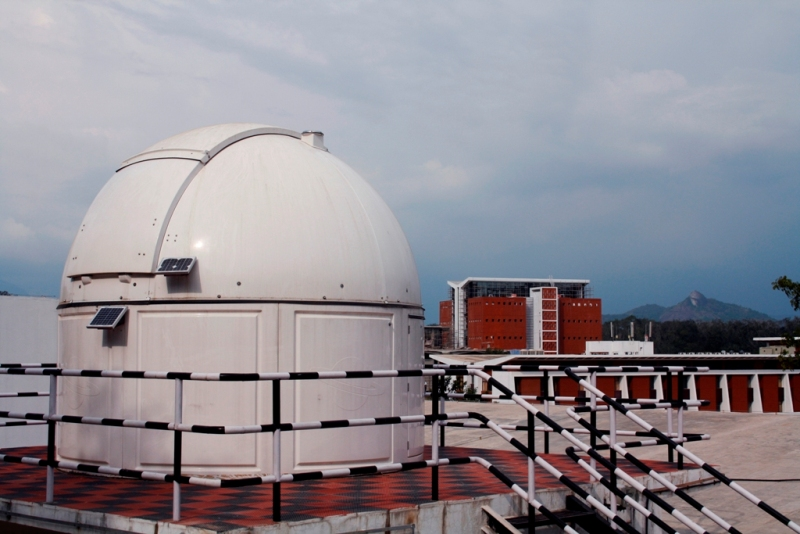
The Observatory at IIST with an 8-inch Celestron telescope. The library building can be seen in the background

== Student activities ==
=== Student projects ===
VYOM ('sky' in Sanskrit) is the sounding rocket designed by the BTech students of IIST. Vyom had its maiden flight on 11 May 2012 when it took to the sky from TERLS and the mission was a success. The objective of the launch was to flight-test the solid rocket motor and the accelerometer payload developed for the project. Vyom is the first student made sounding rocket in Asia and the Vyom Mk II was planned for launch in 2015. IIST also runs a student satellite project, which is also slated for launch in 2014–2015 on board the PSLV.

IEEE Student Branch at IIST

IIST has an active IEEE Student Branch established in 2011. It now has seven organizational sub units including the following student branch chapters:

- IEEE Industrial Applications Society (IAS) Student Branch chapter
- IEEE Antennas and Propagation Society (APS) Student Branch chapter
- IEEE Microwave Theory and Techniques Society (MTTS) Student Branch chapter
- IEEE GRSS Student Branch chapter
- IEEE SIGHT Group Student Branch chapter
- IEEE Education Society (EdSoc) Student Branch chapter
- IEEE RFID Council Student Branch Chapter

=== Student festivals ===
The following student festivals are organised at IIST every year.

==== Conscientia ====
Conscientia is the Annual Astronomy and Technology Festival of IIST. Conscientia offers various challenging events in different fields of engineering and science, including astronomy, aerospace engineering, electronics, computer science, mechanical engineering, robotics, etc. In the year 2010, the astronomy festival Aparimit has been incorporated into Conscientia. The 2010 edition was inaugurated by IIST's Chancellor, A. P. J. Abdul Kalam, former President of India. In just a few years, Conscientia has evolved to become the largest technical festival in the state of Kerala. The 2014 edition of the festival is going to start on 28 February 2014. The official website of the festival

==== Dhanak ====
Dhanak is the Annual Cultural Festival of IIST. Named after the Urdu word for 'rainbow', it stands for the splash of colour and sunshine that this festival brings with it. It spans all facets of cultural activity, including dramatics, fine arts, literature, quizzing, music, dance, film-making, and photography. The most awaited moment at Dhanak is the pronite, in which a DJ/Band is invited to perform. Dhanak 2015 witnessed DJ VH1 Supersonic. Progressive Brothers from DJ Sunburn gave their performance in 2016 and Masala Coffee, South India's largest band performed in Dhanak in 2017. Dhanak also features themes every year based on which the whole campus is decorated. The theme for 2018 was "comicolours".

=== IIST Model United Nations (IIST MUN) ===
Started as an intra-college event in March 2012, IIST MUN has now become a national inter-college Model United Nations with United Nations General Assembly council held successfully in September 2012, 2013, October 2014 and April 2015. It has become an annual event, with the 2019 event being the last one held before the COVID-19 pandemic. After a gap of 3 years, it was held in March 2023. The 2024 edition is going to be held on March 2 and 3, 2024.

== International collaborations ==
IIST has signed a number of memorandums of understanding (MoUs) with international universities and Institutions for joint research, and exchange of students and faculty. These include Caltech-USA, Jet Propulsion Laboratory-USA, TU Delft -The Netherlands, University of Colorado, Boulder-USA, Technion-Israel, University of Cambridge-UK and Nanyang Technological University-Singapore. A number of other collaborations are under discussions. The Satish Dhawan fellowship at California Institute of Technology was announced by K. Radhakrishnan, chairman, ISRO on 3 June 2013. The fellowship provides an opportunity every year starting from the winter session of the academic year 2013–14 to one meritorious graduating student from the Aerospace Department of IIST to be sponsored by the Department of Space, Government of India to pursue master's degree in aerospace engineering at the California Institute of Technology.ISRO and ESA conducted a workshop at IIST in Thiruvanthapuram between 19-23 January 2026 presenting data from Aditya-L1,Proba-3 and Solar Orbiter presenting complementary vantage data points from each mission.

== See also ==
- List of engineering colleges in Kerala
- List of universities in India
- List of autonomous higher education institutes in India
- Department of Space (India)
- Indian Space Research Organisation
- Indian Institutes of Technology
- Indian Institute of Science
- Indian Institute of Astrophysics
- National Institutes of Technology
