= Common Engineering Entrance Examination =

Until 2013, admission to engineering institutes across India was governed by two separate examinations, the Indian Institute of Technology Joint Entrance Examination (IIT-JEE) and the All India Engineering Entrance Examination (AIEEE). In 2010, a proposal for a common engineering entrance examination was made by the Ministry of Human Resource Development. The proposal went through several names and formats before being implemented in 2013 as the Joint Entrance Examination (JEE), which replaced AIEEE with JEE Main and IIT-JEE with JEE Advanced.

== History ==
A common engineering entrance examination was first proposed by the Ministry of Human Resource Development in February 2010 as "a common system for common admission into professional institutions in the country". One of the names proposed was the Indian Science Engineering Eligibility Test (ISEET). It was meant as a replacement for the multitude of existing exams, but most specifically the Indian Institute of Technology Joint Entrance Examination (IIT-JEE) and the All India Engineering Entrance Examination. The first-year version of the exam was planned to cover admissions to centrally-funded institutions, including the Indian Institute of Science (IISc), Indian Institutes of Science Education and Research (IISERs), and some deemed universities. Per the decision of the ministry on 20 May 2012, the exam was to be introduced starting in 2013. Some state governments have already announced they will not attend the exam, at least not for the first year, until doubts, mainly about the languages in which the exam will be made available, are cleared. The proposal also received strong opposition from the All India IIT Faculty Federation (AIFF) and the Indian Institutes of Technology Alumni Association, which stated concerns about the loss of the autonomy of IITs in their admission process.

== Reasons for demand for common entrance exam ==
1. Many engineering colleges in India are known for taking a capitation fee.
2. A common entrance exam will help students and parents save money that they otherwise have to spend on purchasing application forms and prospectus of various engineering colleges. Savings related to travel expenses for attending various entrance exams is another advantage.
3. Transparency in listing of entrance exam rankings and admission to engineering colleges.

== Joint Entrance Examination (JEE) ==
On 18 June 2012, a more specific format was proposed by a joint meeting of the councils of IITs, NITs, and IIITs. As per this proposal, the exam would be called the Joint Entrance Examination (JEE) and would be made up of two parts, JEE-Main and JEE-Advanced. Two distinct "patterns of admission" would be used. For IITs, an average of the marks from Class XII Board exams and JEE-Main would be used for screening, allowing only a fixed number of candidates to be considered for admission. Ranking between these candidates will be based entirely on JEE-Advanced, the format of which would be decided by the Joint Admission Board of IITs. For other institutions (NITs, IIITs, and 20 GFTIs), admissions would be possible only if the candidate has secured at least 75% marks in their class 12th board examinations or has appeared in the top 20 percentile list of their respective boards for the class 12th board examination.

=== Objections ===
Two of the IITs have voiced strong objections to the common examination, and have announced that if the change takes place, they will conduct their admittance exams.

== Recent developments ==
In August 2022, UGC Chairperson M. Jagadesh Kumar spoke about UGC's proposal to merge JEE Main, NEET into CUET as per NEP 2020 while being silent on JEE Advanced, this has led to an outcry among students but Education Minister Dharmendra Pradhan later clarified that merger will not happen in next 2 years.

== See also ==
- List of Engineering Entrance Exams in India
- List of Public Service Commissions in India
