= Bachelor of Design =

Academic undergraduate degree

A Bachelor of Design (BDes or B.Design) degree is usually an undergraduate degree in the field of design awarded for a course or major that generally lasts three or four years. It is the undergraduate equivalent of the Master of Design, MDes. Bachelor of Design degrees have been popular in Canada and Australia for several decades and are gaining popularity in the United States as discipline-specific design education expands and becomes more specialized. There are several variants of the Bachelor of Design degree, including the Bachelor of Design Arts and the Bachelor of Design Studies.

The degree is offered in Canada, Australia, India, the United Kingdom, the United States and other countries. In Canada and Australia, the introduction of the BDes accompanied a period in which several art colleges gained university status and degree-conferring authority. Specializations vary by institution and may include fields such as graphic design, industrial design, fashion design and interior design. Accreditation standards and program structures vary by country.

== By country ==
=== Canada ===
Several Canadian art colleges became degree-granting universities in the 2000s. The Ontario College of Art and Design became OCAD University in 2002 when the Ontario government granted it degree-conferring authority. By 2015 the university had approximately 4,600 students and an operating budget of nearly C$60 million, though it was also contending with enrollment declines and internal tensions over the balance between studio practice and academic research. Simona Chiose, writing in The Globe and Mail, reported that graduation rates at OCAD trailed competitors at 65 percent, compared with 75 percent for fine arts students at Ryerson University and 78 percent at the University of Guelph.

Emily Carr University of Art and Design in Vancouver also gained university status in 2008. Founded in 1925, it serves undergraduate and graduate students. In 2017 it relocated from Granville Island to a purpose-built campus on Great Northern Way.

The Nova Scotia College of Art and Design (NSCAD) also gained university status. Kate Taylor, writing in The Globe and Mail, observed in 2011 that enrollment at OCAD had grown 45 percent over the preceding decade, at NSCAD by 75 percent over 20 years, and at Emily Carr by 50 percent over 10 years. Ron Burnett, then president of Emily Carr, argued that employers were increasingly seeking graduates who combined creative skills with broader analytical training.

=== Australia ===
Several Australian universities offer design degrees. In 2024, Southern Cross University in northern New South Wales announced that it would discontinue all creative arts programs, including degrees in art and design, contemporary music and digital media, citing a national decline in demand. Vice-chancellor Tyrone Carlin told ABC News that the drop was part of a broader Australian trend, noting that the Morrison government's Job-ready Graduates Package of 2021 had increased the cost of arts degrees while reducing fees for STEM subjects.

=== India ===
India has multiple nationally conducted entrance examinations for design education alongside a network of government-funded and prominent private design institutions.

The National Institute of Design (NID) in Ahmedabad was designated an "institution of national importance" by the National Institute of Design Act of 2014. NID operates across multiple campuses and admits students through the NID Design Aptitude Test (NID DAT), conducted annually by NID Ahmedabad.

The National Institute of Fashion Technology (NIFT), established by the NIFT Act of 2006, runs 20 campuses across India. NIFT's entrance examination is conducted by the National Testing Agency.

Since 2015, the Indian Institutes of Technology have also offered the Bachelor of Design through the Undergraduate Common Entrance Examination for Design (UCEED), conducted by IIT Bombay. The examination provides admission to BDes programs at IIT Bombay, IIT Delhi, IIT Guwahati, IIT Hyderabad and IIITDM Jabalpur.

Private sector institutions, such as Amity University, Mumbai, also offer dedicated professional Bachelor of Design (B.Des) curricula through specialized divisions like the Amity School of Fashion Technology.

=== United Kingdom ===
Design education in the United Kingdom is delivered through specialist art and design institutions. The University of the Arts London (UAL) comprises six colleges, including Central Saint Martins, Chelsea College of Arts and the London College of Fashion.

British art and design colleges faced large funding cuts in the early 2010s. The Guardian reported in 2011 that UAL was set to lose more than £50 million in public funding by 2015, prompting plans to expand postgraduate and overseas provision while restructuring undergraduate courses. Rector Nigel Carrington described the situation as "a complete collapse of funding for universities like this" and stated that by 2015, 75 percent of UAL's income would come directly from students. The university set undergraduate fees at £9,000 a year from 2012. Goldsmiths, University of London also faced the loss of its teaching budget.

=== United States ===
In the United States, design education is delivered through specialist art and design schools and design programs within larger universities. The National Association of Schools of Art and Design (NASAD) accredits institutional members that offer degrees in art and design, including the BFA, BS and BDes.

== Examples ==
Examples of B.Des. degrees include:

- Bachelor of Design: Architecture. This is a degree focused on Architectural Design. Those who would like to eventually pursue licensure should instead pursue the Bachelor of Architecture or Master of Architecture degrees which are recognized by the National Council of Architectural Registration Boards (NCARB).
- Bachelor of Design: Interior design
- Bachelor of Design: Advertising
- Bachelor of Design: Fashion design
- Bachelor of Design: Graphic design
- Bachelor of Design: Game design
- Bachelor of Design: Media design
- Bachelor of Design: Audiovisual Media
- Bachelor of Design: Textile Design
- Bachelor of Design: Jewelry and Metalsmithing
- Bachelor of Design: Industrial design. In the United States, the National Association of Schools of Art and Design (NASAD) which accredits most industrial design programs does not distinguish between the Bachelor of Design: Industrial Design and the older Bachelor of Industrial Design (BID) degree which has been awarded since the 1970s. Certification of Industrial Design degree programs by the Industrial Designers Society of America (IDSA) has been proposed but does not currently exist.
- Bachelor of Design: Visual communications design
- Bachelor of Design: Product Design
- Bachelor of Design: Design and Digital Arts
- Bachelor of Design: Interaction Design
- Bachelor of Design: Interior Architecture

== See also ==
- Master of Design
- Design education
