= Bhatan =

- Location in Maharashtra, India
- Coordinates: 18.93°N 73.15°E
- Country: India
- State: Maharashtra
- District: Raigad district

Area
  - Total: 4.64 km^{2} (1.79 sq mi)
- Elevation: 10 m (33 ft)

Population (2011)
  - Total: 1,452
  - Density: 313/km^{2} (810/sq mi)

Languages
  - Official: Marathi, Hindi
- Time zone: UTC+5:30 (IST)
- PIN: 410221
- Telephone Code: 0215
- Sex ratio: 1.1 ♂/♀
- Lok Sabha constituency: Maval

Bhatan is a village located in Raigad district, Konkan division, in the state of Maharashtra, India. It is 9 km from the Mumbai–Pune Expressway, 10 km away from sub-district headquarter Panvel and 60 km away from district headquarter Alibag. As per 2009 stats, it is a Gram panchayat.

== Demographics ==
As of 2011 India Census, the population is 1452 people (761 were males and 691 were females) with Sex ratio of 1.1.

== Landmarks ==
- There is a tunnel through this village, namely Bhatan Tunnel, which is the longest tunnel on Mumbai-Pune Expressway. It connects Mumbai and Pune with two connections; The Mumbai-Pune (North) tube and The Pune-Mumbai (South) tube, of lengths 1,053 m and 1,088 m.
- Amity University, Mumbai is also located within the jungles of this village.
- The university is reachable via Maharashtra State Highway 76, lengthening barely 4 km.
