= Kuruvilla Joseph =

Indian materials scientist

Kuruvilla Joseph FRSC
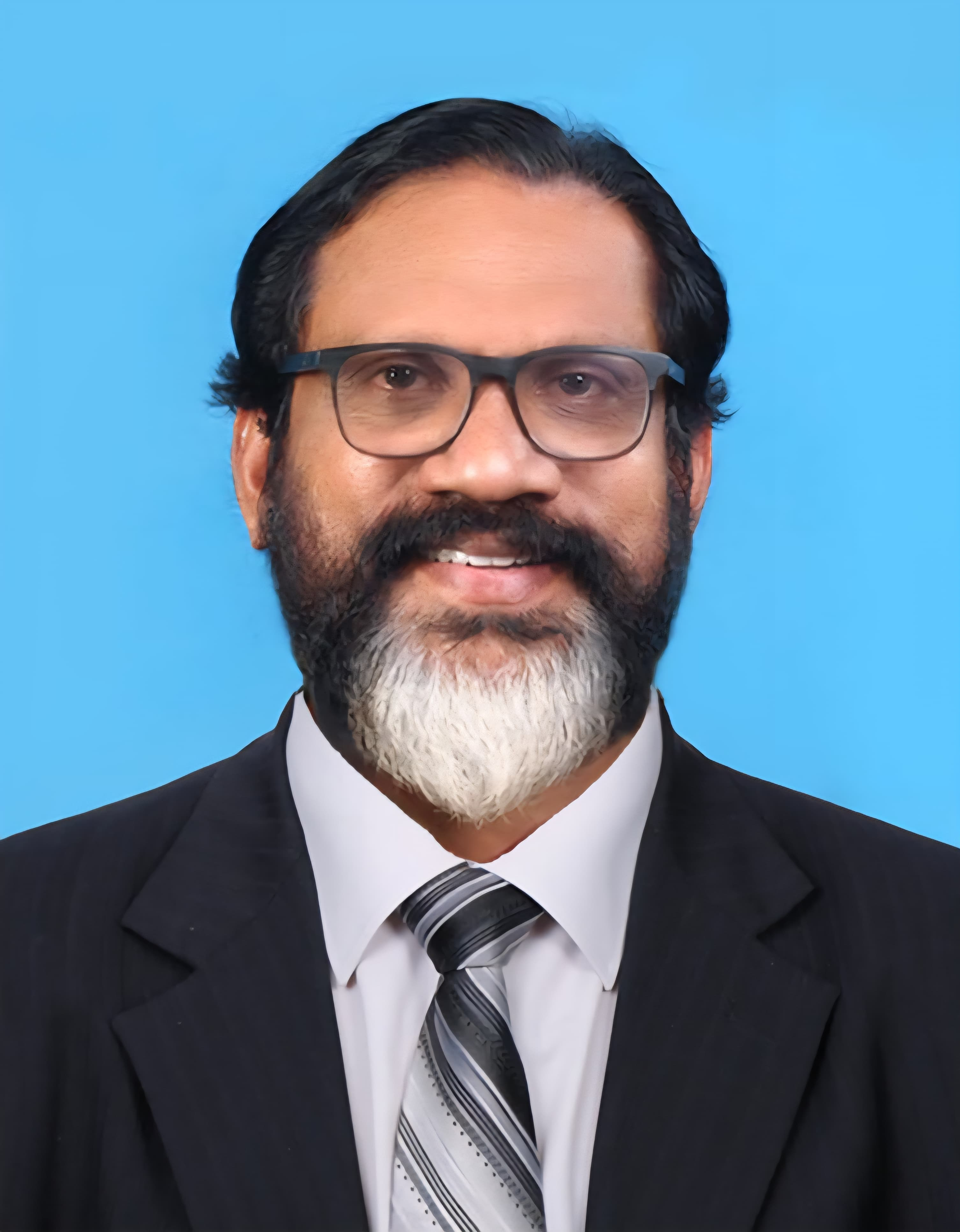
- Joseph in 2024

Pro-Vice Chancellor of the Indian Institute of Space Science and Technology
- Incumbent
- Assumed office 9 July 2025
- Prime Minister: Narendra Modi
- Chancellor: B. N. Suresh
- Preceded by: Office established

Personal details
- Born: 25 May 1964 (age 62) Kottayam, Kerala, India
- Spouse: Beena Kuruvilla
- Children: 2
- Education: University of Kerala (B.Sc.); Mahatma Gandhi University, Kerala (M.Sc., Ph.D.); Federal University of Paraíba (post-doc); Swedish Institute of Composites (post-doc)
- Profession: Materials scientist, Academic administrator
- Known for: Polymer blends, Nanocomposites, Green materials
- Awards: Stanford global top 2% scientists Fellow, Royal Society of Chemistry; Young Scientist Award (ISCA); Young Scientist Award (Kerala Govt.)
- Website: IIST faculty profile Personal webpage

Kuruvilla Joseph (born 25 May 1964) is an Indian materials scientist and academic administrator, currently serving as the Distinguished Professor and the first Pro-Vice Chancellor at the Indian Institute of Space Science and Technology (IIST), Asia's first space institute established by the Indian Space Research Organisation (ISRO) and functioning under the Department of Space, Government of India. He also holds the position of Registrar of the institute. He previously served as the Dean (Academics), Dean (Student Activities), and Head of the Department of Chemistry at the institute. He is best known for his research in polymer science and nanomaterials, he has made significant contributions to the field of materials science, particularly in polymer blends, nanocomposites, and green materials. For the last five consecutive years (2020–2025), he has been listed in the prestigious Stanford/Elsevier list of the world's top 2% scientists across all subject fields.

== Early life and education ==
Kuruvilla Joseph was born in Kottayam District in the state of Kerala. He earned a B.Sc. from the University of Kerala and M.Sc. from the Mahatma Gandhi University, Kottayam. He completed his Ph.D. at the National Institute for Interdisciplinary Science and Technology (NIIST) in collaboration with the School of Chemical Sciences at Mahatma Gandhi University, Kerala. He pursued post-doctoral research at the Federal University of Paraiba in Brazil and the Swedish Institute of Composites (SICOMP), Sweden, enhancing his expertise in polymer science and nanotechnology.

== Career and research ==
Joseph began his academic career at St. Xavier's College, Thumba (1993-1994) followed by St. Berchmans College, Changanassery (1994-2007), rising from Lecturer to Reader. He joined IIST in 2007 as Professor and Head, Department of Chemistry and became a Senior Professor in 2015. He was promoted to the Outstanding Professor in 2020 and assumed the roles of Registrar in 2023, Dean (Academics) in 2024, and was recently appointed IIST’s first Pro-Vice Chancellor in July 2025.

Throughout his academic career, Joseph has been an influential figure in research and education. His research interests span nanomaterials, polymer blends, biosensors, green composites, and the degradation of polymers. Joseph's scholarly contributions include about 230 journal publications, along with several book chapters and six academic books.

He holds three patents and has an h-index of 66 and an i10-index of 201. His work has garnered global recognition, being listed among the top 2% of scientists worldwide by Stanford University.

== Awards and recognition ==
Joseph was named a Fellow of the Royal Society of Chemistry (FRSC) and received the Young Scientist Award from both the Indian Science Congress Association and the Government of Kerala. His contributions have also earned him rankings among the top materials scientists in India.

== Books authored ==
- Thomas, S., Joseph, K., Malhotra, S. K., Goda, K., and Sreekala, M. S. (Eds.). (2013). "Polymer Composites": Volume 1, 2, and 3. Wiley-VCH. ISBN 978-3527645213.
- Kuruvilla, J., Wilson, R., and Gejo, G. (Eds.). (2019). "Materials for Potential EMI Shielding Applications: Processing, Properties and Current Trends". Elsevier. ISBN 978-0128175910.
- Kuruvilla, J., Oksman, K., Gejo, G., Wilson, R., and Appukuttan, S. (Eds.). (2021). "Fiber Reinforced Composites: Constituents, Compatibility, Perspectives and Applications". Woodhead Publishing. ISBN 978-0128210901.
- Thomas, S., Joseph, K., Appukuttan, S., and Mathew, M. (2022). "Luminescent Metal Nanoclusters: Synthesis, Characterization, and Applications". Woodhead Publishing. ISBN 978-0323886574.
- Joseph, K., Wilson, R., George, G., Appukuttan, S. (2023). "Lignin-based Materials: Health Care and Medical Applications". Royal Society of Chemistry. ISBN 978-1839165351.
