= AURO University =

Private university in Gujarat, India

- Type: Private
- Established: 2011
- Founder: Hasmukh (H.P.) Rama
- President: Hasmukh (H.P.) Rama
- Location: Surat, Gujarat, India; 21.1796°N 72.7348°E
- Website: www.aurouniversity.edu.in

AURO University, formerly AURO University of Hospitality and Management, is a private university located at Surat, Gujarat, India. It was established in 2011 by the Rama family through The Gujarat Private Universities (Amendment) Act, 2011. Dr Parimal Vyas is the VC of the university
