= Gujarat Common Entrance Test =

Gujarat Common Entrance Test (GCET) is an annual common entrance exam for MBA and MCA studies in Gujarat, India, since 2002. Every year it is conducted between March and August. Gujarat Technological University was inaugurated in October 2007. Then, it started conducting GCET.

== MBA programmes ==
=== Admission and exam pattern ===
There two types of admissions seats covered under GCET:

- Grant-in-Aid (GIA) for University run departments. Fees are significantly low.
- SFI (Self Financed) for private institutes.

The written test comprises sections on quantitative ability, reasoning, data interpretation, reading comprehension, verbal ability, and general knowledge. Examinees can take the test in English or Gujarati.

=== Institutes covered ===
Few prominent institutes are:

- School of Management and Entrepreneurship, Auro University of Hospitality and Management, Surat
- B K School of Business Management, Ahmedabad
- Faculty of Management Studies, The M S University of Baroda, Vadodara
- Centre for Management Studies, Dharmsinh Desai University, Nadiad
- AES Post Graduate Institute of Business Management, Ahmedabad
- Som-Lalit Institute of Business Management Studies, Ahmedabad
- G H Patel PG Institute of Business Management, Vallabh Vidya Nagar
- R D Gardi Institute of Business Management, Rajkot
- Department of Business & Industrial Management, Surat

=== GCET 2009 ===
5,429 MBA admissions were given. Out of it, 3,298 admissions were from Open/General category; while 1,463 from SEBC category. 7% seats are reserved for Scheduled Caste, 15% for Scheduled Tribes and 27% seats are for Socially & Educationally Backward Classes (including widows and orphans).

#	Name of Institute	University	Place	GIA or SFI	Rank of last candidate admitted from Open Category
1	Auro University of Hospitality and Management	Auro University	Surat	GIA	-
2	B K School of Business Management	Gujarat University	Ahmedabad	GIA	66.0
3	M S Patel Institute (Faculty of Management Studies)	The M S University of Baroda	Vadodara	GIA	77.0
4	AES PG Institute of Business Management	Gujarat University	Ahmedabad	SFI	189.0
5	Som-Lalit Institute of Business Management	Gujarat University	Ahmedabad	SFI	238.0
6	G H Patel PG Institute of Business Management	Sardar Patel University	Vallabh Vidhyanagar	GIA	263.0
7	NR Institute of Business Management	Gujarat University	Ahmedabad	SFI	329.0
8	G H Patel PG Institute of Business Management	Sardar Patel University	Vallabh Vidhyanagar	SFI	384.0
9	Centre for Management Studies	Dharmsinh Desai University	Nadiad	GIA	385.0
10	Department of Business & Industrial Management	Veer Narmad South Gujarat University	Surat	GIA	433.0
11	GLS Institute of Computer Technology		Ahmedabad	SFI	445.0
12	Centre for Management Studies	Dharmsinh Desai University	Nadiad	SFI	546.4
13	Shri Chimanbhai Patel Institute of Management & Research	Gujarat University	Ahmedabad	SFI	623.0
14	RD Gardi Institute of Business Management	Saurashtra University	Rajkot	GIA	668.0

Note: GIA: Grants-in-aid, SFI: Self-financed

== See also ==
- M S Patel Institute, FMS, The M S University of Baroda
- Common Admission Test
- B K School of Business Management
- Gujarat University
