= Rajeev Kumar (computer scientist) =

Indian Computer Scientist, Activist and Whistleblower

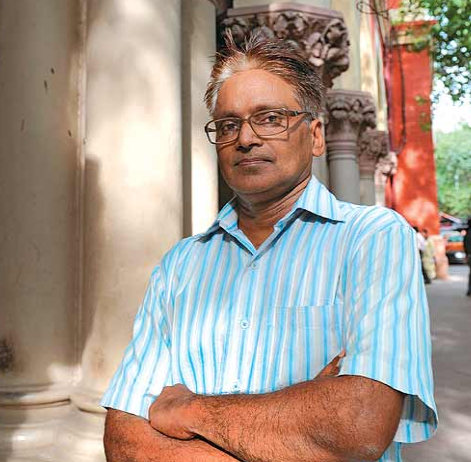
- Born: 12 March 1959 (age 67); India
- Citizenship: Indian
- Education: (Bsc) Rohilkhand University (MSc) University of Allahabad (M.Tech) IIT Roorkee (PhD) University of Sheffield
- Scientific career
- Fields: Computer Science
- Workplaces: IIT Kharagpur; BITS Pilani; Jawaharlal Nehru University; IIT Kanpur

Rajeev Kumar (born 12 March 1959) is an Indian computer scientist, activist and former professor at Jawaharlal Nehru University. He is known for his activism and his legal fight against IITs where he advocated for reforms and transparency in the admission process of IITs.

== Education ==
Rajeev Kumar was born on 12 March 1959 in India he completed his Bsc degree in physics, maths and chemistry from Rohilkhand University and his MSc in Physics from University of Allahabad where he secured third rank in the university. He then went on to complete his M.Tech in computer science from IIT Roorkee and ranked first in the institute. After which he completed his PhD in computer engineering from University of Sheffield in UK.

== Highlighting irregularities in IITs admission process ==
He is known for his fight against IITs to amend the eligibility criteria of admission through the JEE exams. In 2010, after a "protracted legal struggle" over the years with several tiers of the IIT administration, the Delhi High Court ordered the IITs to reveal such information. Since 2012, every candidate gets a carbon copy of their paper, and the various cutoffs are announced. Due to his activism he was suspended and forcefully retired by IIT Kharagpur in 2014 until he was reinstated in 2017 by former President Pranab Mukherjee.

=== Suspension for whistleblowing ===
In 2011, Kumar was suspended for damaging the reputation of IIT Kharagpur by reporting the extensive cheating going on in the institute and for exposing a scam in the purchase of laptops. The institute had also illegally accessed Kumar's phone records. This led to Supreme Court lawyer and activist Prashant Bhushan requesting the MHRD Minister Kapil Sibal to ensure that whistleblowers like Rajeev are not harassed. Despite letters from the MHRD and the Central Vigilance Commission in 2013, IIT Kharagpur did not revoke his suspension. In July 2012, the registrar of IIT wrote to the ministry "saying the withdrawal of suspension of Prof. Kumar and resumption of duties would adversely affect the academic atmosphere of the institute."

Finally, the suspension was lifted in May 2013,
