= Indian Institute of Petroleum and Energy =

Indian university

- Motto: vidyā praśasyatē lokaiḥ (Sanskrit)
- Motto in English: Knowledge is extolled by everyone
- Type: Public
- Established: 2016; 10 years ago
- President: Paritosh K. Banik
- Director: Shalivahan
- Location: Vangali, Sabbavaram, Anakapalli, Andhra Pradesh, India; 17.82731463681259°N 83.08583563441883°E
- Campus: 201.8 acres (81.7 ha); Rural
- Website: iipe.ac.in

Indian Institute of Petroleum and Energy (IIPE), is an Institute of National Importance, located in Vangali, Sabbavaram Mandal, Anakapalli District, Andhra Pradesh.

It is a domain-specific Institute at par with IITs and IIMs, established by the Government of India under the aegis of the Ministry of Petroleum and Natural Gas (MoPNG).

HPCL, IOCL, ONGC, GAIL, and OIL, supports IIPE.

== Campus ==
The Institute is headquartered at its permanent campus in Vangali Village, Sabbavaram Mandal, in Anakapalli District. The campus occupies 201.8 acres (81.7 ha) of land provided by the Government of Andhra Pradesh.

From its establishment in 2016 until December 2025, IIPE operated from a transit campus at Andhra University. The groundbreaking ceremony for the permanent facility was conducted by Prime Minister Narendra Modi on March 2, 2024.

Following the completion of Phase-1 construction, the institute transitioned all academic operations to the new site during the 2025 winter break. Classes officially commenced at the permanent campus on January 5, 2026.

The ₹400 crore Phase-1 infrastructure includes centrally air-conditioned academic blocks, student hostels for 950 residents, and faculty quarters. The campus is designed for a GRIHA four-star sustainability rating.

== Academics ==
IIPE offers undergraduate, postgraduate, and doctoral programs. The institute's academic structure is modeled after the Indian Institutes of Technology (IITs).

=== Undergraduate Programs ===
The institute offers four-year Bachelor of Technology (B.Tech) degrees, with admission based on the JEE-Advanced rankings. The branches offered include:

- Petroleum Engineering
- Chemical Engineering
- Mechanical Engineering
- Mathematics and Computing (Introduced in 2025; focuses on AI and Data Science).

=== Postgraduate and Doctoral Programs ===
- M.Sc. in Applied Geology: Admission is conducted through the IIT-JAM.
- M.Tech. in Petroleum Engineering: A specialized program with advanced industry alignment.
- Web-based M.Tech. in Data Science & Machine Learning: A self-paced program designed for working professionals.
- Ph.D.: Research programs are offered in engineering, basic sciences, and humanities.

== Departments ==
The Institute has several departments:

- Department of Petroleum Engineering and Earth Sciences
- Department of Chemical Engineering
- Department of Mechanical Engineering
- Department of Humanities and Sciences

== Collaborations ==
IIPE has established collaborations with both National and International Institutions to enhance academic and research activities.

=== National Collaborations ===
- IIPE has partnered with institutions such as IIT Kharagpur, IIT Madras, IIT Delhi, and IIT Hyderabad to facilitate academic and research collaborations.
- The institute has also worked with the Central Institute of Mining and Fuel Research and the Petroleum & Explosives Safety Organization to conduct research in energy-related fields and safety standards.
- Andhra University has provided infrastructure support to IIPE until its permanent campus is established.

=== International Collaborations ===
IIPE has signed agreements with international universities to promote academic exchanges and joint research initiatives.

- University of Houston (USA) for research collaborations, Stony Brook University (USA) for faculty and student exchange programs, and Ufa State Petroleum Technological University (Russia) for joint projects.
- University of Bergen (Norway), Kyung Hee University (South Korea), and Sharif University of Technology (Iran), focusing on research and faculty exchange in energy and environmental studies.

== See also ==
- Institutes of National Importance
