= Indian Institute of Information Technology, Design and Manufacturing, Jabalpur =

Higher-education institute in Jabalpur, India

Indian Institute of Information Technology Design & Manufacturing, Jabalpur
- Motto: Born for innovation
- Type: Public institution
- Established: 2005; 21 years ago
- Chairperson: Deepak Ghaisas
- Director: Bhartendu K. Singh
- Faculty: 73
- Undergraduates: 1,576
- Postgraduates: 111
- Location: Jabalpur, Madhya Pradesh, 482005, India; 23.177°N 80.025°E
- Campus: 260 acres (110 ha); Suburban
- Website: www.iiitdmj.ac.in

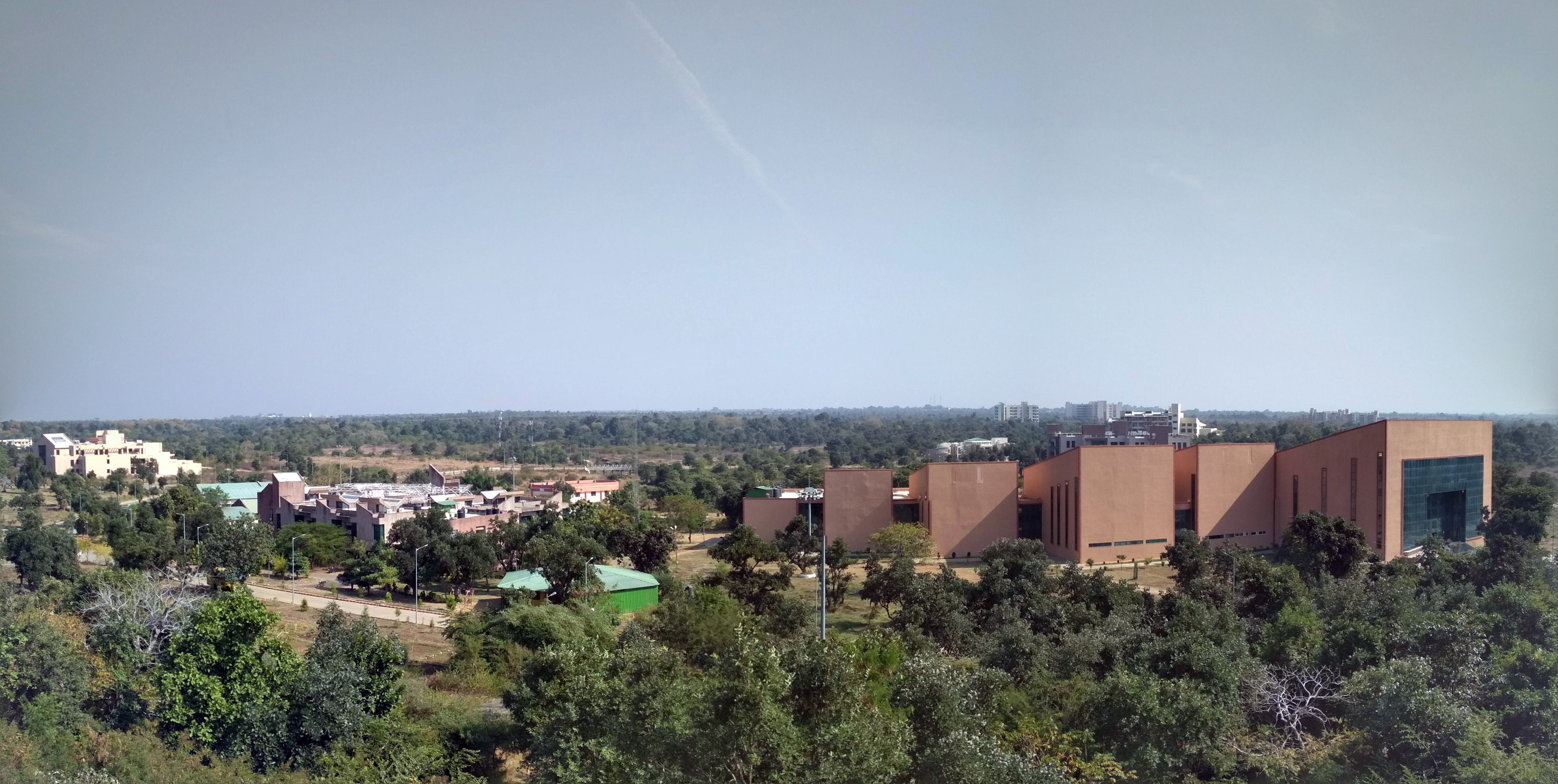
Core Lab Complex (left) and Lecture Hall Complex (right), IIITDM Jabalpur

Indian Institute of Information Technology, Design and Manufacturing, Jabalpur (IIITDM Jabalpur), also known as Pandit Dwarka Prasad Mishra Indian Institute of Information Technology, Design and Manufacturing (PDPM IIITDM), is an Indian Institute of Information Technology in Jabalpur, Madhya Pradesh, India, focused on Information Technology-enabled Design and Manufacturing. It was founded in 2005 and declared an Institute of National Importance by Parliament under the IIIT Act in 2014.

== Campus ==
The IIITDM Jabalpur campus spans approximately 260 acres in Dumna, east of Jabalpur, situated between the Dumna Nature Reserve Park and Jabalpur Airport. The academic area includes the Lecture Hall and Tutorial Complex (LHTC) and the Core Lab Complex (CLC), which house departmental annexes, faculty cabins, and the Design Studio. The campus also has an Open Air Theatre and a Student Activity Center.

== Academics ==
=== Programmes ===
The institute offers B.Tech, B.Des, M.Tech, M.Des, and Ph.D. programmes.

==== B.Tech ====
- Computer Science and Engineering
- Electronics and Communication Engineering
- Mechanical Engineering
- Smart Manufacturing

==== B.Des ====
- Design Engineering

==== M.Tech ====
Postgraduate programmes are offered in Computer Science and Engineering, Electronics and Communication Engineering, Mechanical Engineering, and Smart Manufacturing disciplines.

==== M.Des ====
- Integrated Product Design

==== Ph.D ====
Doctoral programmes are offered in Computer Science and Engineering, Electronics and Communication Engineering, Mechanical Engineering, Smart Manufacturing, Design, Natural Sciences, and Liberal Arts.

=== Disciplines ===
==== Computer Science and Engineering ====
The largest discipline by student intake, established in 2005, offering B.Tech, M.Tech, and Ph.D. programmes. Research focus areas include AI and Machine Learning, Data Science, Computer Vision, IoT and Embedded Systems, Network and Information Security, Cybersecurity, and Cloud Computing.

==== Electronics and Communication Engineering ====
Focuses on hands-on training and research in frontier areas of Electronics and Communication Engineering with emphasis on IT-enabled design and manufacturing. Laboratory facilities cover RF and Microwave, Communications, Signal and Image Processing, Micro and Nano Electronics, and Power and Control Systems.

==== Mechanical Engineering ====
Established in 2005, offering B.Tech programmes in Mechanical Engineering and Smart Manufacturing, and M.Tech and Ph.D. programmes at postgraduate level, with active funded and interdisciplinary research groups.

==== Natural Sciences ====
An integral discipline since the institute's inception, covering Physics and Mathematics, with research focus on nanomaterials, semiconductor thin films, perovskite solar cells, magnetic and multiferroic materials, and mathematical modelling.

==== Design ====
Established in 2008, the Design discipline has modern fabrication and prototyping facilities including laser cutting, 3D printing, vacuum forming, VR kits, and eye-tracking systems. The institute is a member of the World Wide Consortium on Design Services with TU Delft (Netherlands), EAFIT University (Colombia), and Vaal University of Technology (South Africa).

==== Liberal Arts ====
Established in August 2021, supporting multidisciplinary education across the institute.

=== Admissions ===
B.Tech admissions are based on JEE Main rank via JoSAA counselling. B.Des admissions are through UCEED. M.Tech admissions use GATE scores via CCMT, and M.Des admissions use CEED scores.

The UG seat matrix (2026–27) is as follows:

Seat Matrix UG 2023–24
Discipline	Sanctioned Strength
Computer Science Engineering	275
Electronics and Communication Engineering	137
Mechanical Engineering	69
Smart Manufacturing	69
Bachelor of Design	66
Total	616

=== Rankings ===
Academic rankings

Engineering – India
- NIRF (2022): 82
- NIRF (2023): 97
- NIRF (2024): 101–150

== Research ==
The institute conducts active research in Innovative Design and Manufacturing, Graphics and Computer Vision, Advanced Manufacturing, Data and Knowledge Engineering, Wireless Networks, and Biomedical Signal Processing. Research is carried out through postgraduate theses and sponsored projects from organisations including the Indian Ordnance Factories.

== Student life ==
=== Festivals ===
Students organise three annual festivals: Tarang (cultural), Abhikalpan (science and technology),Gusto (sports),Riwayat(cultural) and Enthuse(sports).

=== Clubs ===
The institute has several student activity clubs:

- Abhivyakti Club – Art and Craft
- Astronomy and Physics Society – Astronomy and physics related sessions, events and workshops
- Automotive and Fabrication Club – Automobile design and development
- Business and Management Club – Alumni meets and management talks
- IIITDMJ Racing Club – Racing events and inter-institutional competitions
- The Programming Club – Programming sessions and events, including HackByte, an MLH-accredited national hackathon
- SAAZ – Music club
- Samvaad – Literature and quizzing club

== Notable alumni ==
- Surbhi Namdeo (B.Tech ME, 2011–15) – Thermal engineer at ISRO, contributed thermal analysis for the Chandrayaan-3 Rover and Lander at ISRO Satellite Centre, Bengaluru.
- Satyam Jayashawal (B.Tech ME, 2011–15) – Thermal engineer at ISRO, working in the same team as Surbhi Namdeo on Chandrayaan-3 thermal analysis.
- Abhishek Patel (B.Tech ME, 2015–19) – Engineer at ISRO's Telemetry, Tracking and Command Network (ISTRAC), Bengaluru, supporting launch vehicle tracking and data acquisition for Chandrayaan-3.
