= Avantika University =

Private university in Madhya Pradesh

Coordinates: 23.087°N 75.717°E

- Type: Private University
- Established: 2015
- Founder: Vishwanath Karad
- Chancellor: Sanjay Dhande
- Vice-Chancellor: Nitin Rane
- Location: Ujjain, Madhya Pradesh, India
- Campus: Urban
- Website: www.avantikauniversity.edu.in

MIT Pune's Avantika University is a private, cross-disciplinary university based in Ujjain, Madhya Pradesh, India. It has been described as India's first design-centered university. The university is the part of Maharashtra Institute of Technology, Pune. It offers BDes, MDes, BTech CSE (AI & ML in Collabpration with HCL Tech, BCA, MCA, BSc Computer Science, BTech (Cyber Security/ Cloud Computing/ Full Stack Development/ UX), MBA (Business Analytic & AI in Collaboration with HCL Tech, MBA, BBA, BCom, BA JMC, BA LLB (H), BBA LLB (H), LLM, & PhD.

== Programs ==
Avantika University offers UG, PG and PhD Courses in Design, Engineering, Management and Law Programs such as BDes MDes in Product Design, Graphics Design, UX Design, also BTech Computer Science Engineering in Full Stack Development, Data Science, Artificial Intelligence, Cyber Security, Cloud Computing, UX Engineering, also BBA, MBA in Marketing, Finance, Human Resource, Supply Chain Management, Business Analytics, International Business.

== Campus ==
The campus spreads over 1300,000 sq. ft, with academic, administrative, residential, sports and convention space. It also holds contemporary design studios, Computer labs, the Centre of Excellence by CISCO, HCL Tech, and lecture theaters. High-speed digital connectivity, online libraries, interactive classrooms, and data centers are also available on campus.

== Offices ==
1. Avantika University, Vishwanathpuram, Lekoda, Ujjain, 456006, MP, India
2. Indore Office: Avantika University Indore Office: Vibrant Business Tower, 104, AB Rd, above Ola and Nissan, Manorama Ganj, Indore, Madhya Pradesh 452001
