= Amity University, Mumbai =

Private University in India

- Type: Private
- Established: 2014
- Affiliations: University Grants Commission
- President: Dr. Aseem Chauhan
- Vice-Chancellor: Dr. Aruni Wilson Santhosh Kumar
- Location: Navi Mumbai, Maharashtra, India; 18.9316079°N 73.1601956°E
- Website: amity.edu/mumbai/

Amity University, Mumbai (AUM) is a private university located in Bhatan Village of Panvel, Maharashtra, India. It was established in 2014 by the Ritnand Balved Education Foundation.

== Recognition ==
It is a State-Private University, established under Government of Maharashtra Act No. 13 of 2014 and is recognised by the University Grants Commission.

== Campus ==
The campus of the university is located in the village Bhatan at Raigad district. It includes indoor and outdoor sports facilities, and residential accommodation for staffs and students.

== Academics ==
The university offers academic programs in the various fields, at both undergraduate and postgraduate levels including honors levels, besides offering doctoral degrees in several disciplines. T

=== Notable Alumni ===
- Dev Joshi – Television actor, widely recognized for his lead title role in the Baalveer franchise.
- Kulpreet Yadav – Indian novelist, screenwriter, and actor known for his contributions to contemporary literature and cinema.
