= IIT Jodhpur =

Public engineering institution located in Jodhpur, India

Indian Institute of Technology Jodhpur
- Motto: tvaṃ jñānamayo vijñānamayo’si (Sanskrit)
- Motto in English: You are full of supreme wisdom and knowledge
- Type: Public technical university
- Established: 2008 (18 years ago)
- Chairman: A. S. Kiran Kumar
- Director: Avinash Kumar Agarwal
- Faculty: 238
- Students: 3,308
- Undergraduates: 1,742
- Postgraduates: 832
- Doctoral students: 734
- Location: Jodhpur, Rajasthan, India; 26.475°N 73.115°E
- Campus: 852 acres (3.45 km^{2}); Urban
- Colors: Red Black
- Nickname: IITJ
- Website: www.iitj.ac.in

Indian Institute of Technology Jodhpur (IIT Jodhpur or IITJ) is a public technical university located in Jodhpur in the state of Rajasthan in India. IIT Jodhpur is officially recognized as an Institute of National Importance by the Government of India. It is one of the eight Indian Institutes of Technology (IITs) established by the Ministry of Education (MoE), Government of India under The Institutes of Technology (Amendment) Act, 2011.

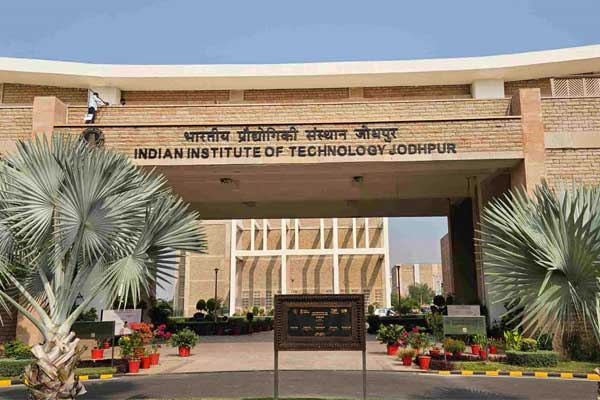
Entrance of IIT Jodhpur

== History ==
IIT Jodhpur was established by the Ministry of Human Resource Development (MHRD), Government of India in the year 2008, under The Institutes of Technology (Amendment) Act, 2011 which declares the new eight IITs as well as the conversion of the Institute of Technology, Banaras Hindu University to IIT. The Act was passed in the Lok Sabha on 24 March 2011 and by the Rajya Sabha on 30 April 2012.. With Prof. Prem Kumar Kalra as it's founding director, the first academic session of IIT Jodhpur began at the IIT Kanpur campus. The first batch of students consisted of 109 undergraduate students in Computer Science Engineering, Mechanical Engineering and Electrical Engineering. The institute was sanctioned as an IIT for Rajasthan, and not for Jodhpur in specific. It was after considering various cities, including Ajmer, Bikaner, Jaipur, Jodhpur, Kota and Udaipur that the Prof. Vijay Shankar Vyas led committee suggested Jodhpur as the location for the IIT in Rajasthan. In late 2009, the MHRD granted final approval for establishing the institute at Jodhpur.

A portion of the MBM Engineering College under JNV University, Jodhpur was identified as the location for the transit campus of IIT Jodhpur. In May 2010, classes of IIT Jodhpur were shifted from IIT Kanpur to the transit campus in Jodhpur. In July 2017, the academic and residential campuses of IIT Jodhpur were migrated to the permanent campus. Construction of the permanent campus is still in progress.

== Campus ==
=== Permanent campus ===
IITJ is located about 24 km from Jodhpur city on National Highway 62 which connects Jodhpur to Nagaur. The site spans over 852 acres (3.45 km^{2}) of land around Jhipasni and Gharao villages. M. M. Pallam Raju, then Union Minister for Human Resources Development, laid the foundation stone on 16 April 2013.

The permanent campus is being built on a self-sustainable model, catering for its own energy and water requirements. The campus' masterplan got 'GRIHA Exemplary Performance Award' under 'Passive Architecture Design' category at the 8th GRIHA Summit held during 2–3 March 2017, at India Habitat Centre, New Delhi.

=== Transit academic campus ===
Transit academic campus

Until the first migration of IITJ to the permanent campus, IIT Jodhpur used to function from its transit campus, at the Department of Computer Science, MBM Engineering College. The transit campus is separate from the main campus of MBM Engineering College. The transit academic campus has 20 laboratories, six classrooms of 50-person capacity and four classrooms of 200-person capacity. Two of the four large classrooms have networking and video conferencing facility to facilitate video-conferencing lectures.

The academic campus' sports facilities include basketball, football, cricket, volleyball and badminton courts.

=== Transit residential campus ===
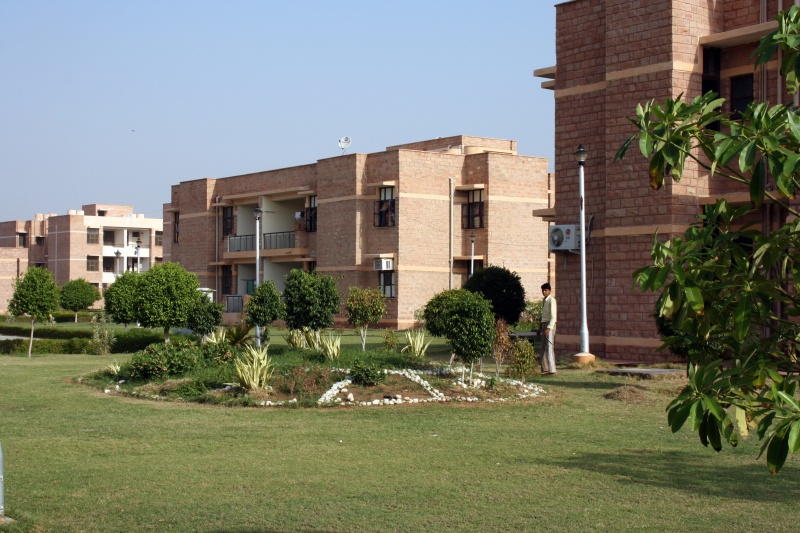
Transit residential campus

IIT Jodhpur had set up its transit residential campus at Kendranchal colony on New Pali Road, Jodhpur. Faculty and students used to reside in the transit residential campus, which had a dining facility and a health center. It has courts for outdoor and indoor sports. There was a computer center and library annexure.

The residential campus was connected to the academic campus by institute's buses which run at frequent intervals.

== Organisation and administration ==
=== Governance ===
All IITs follow the same organization structure which has President of India as visitor at the top of the hierarchy. Directly under the president is the IIT Council. Under the IIT Council is the board of governors of each IIT. Under the board of governors is the director, who is the chief academic and executive officer of the IIT. Under the director, in the organizational structure, comes the deputy director. Under the director and the deputy director, come the deans, heads of departments, registrar.

=== Departments ===
The Institute has organised its academic activities to be conducted through 15 Departments & Schools. The departments are:

- School of Artificial Intelligence & Data Science
- School of Design
- School of Management and Entrepreneurship
- School of Liberal Arts (SoLA)
- Biosciences and Bioengineering
- Chemical Engineering
- Chemistry
- Civil and Infrastructure Engineering
- Computer Science & Engineering
- Electrical Engineering
- Humanities & Social Sciences
- Metallurgical & Materials Engineering
- Mathematics
- Mechanical Engineering
- Physics

== Academics ==
=== Admissions ===
For undergraduates, IIT Jodhpur offers B.Tech. programs. Admissions to BTech programs are carried through Joint Entrance Examination, after completing 10+2 schooling.

For PG Courses, it offers MTech, MSc, MSc – MTech, MTech – PhD (discontinued from 2025 onwards), MBA, MDes and PhD programs. The Mtech - PhD program, however, is now discontinued with the 2024 batch as the last intake. IIT Jodhpur also offers MedTech and MedTech - PhD program in collaboration with AIIMS Jodhpur. The eligibility criteria for MTech involves degree in BTech, B.E., or BSc (Engineering) with at least 60% marks or 6.5/10 Cumulative Performance Index (CPI) or Cumulative Grade Point Average (CGPA). A valid GATE score is necessary for considering enrollment for the MTech program. The MSc programs are administered through the JAM exam with other minimum qualifying criteria in place.

=== Rankings ===
India Rankings 2025: Engineering rankings

Engineering – India
- NIRF (2024): 27

Indian Institute of Technology Jodhpur was ranked in 28th place among engineering colleges by the National Institutional Ranking Framework (NIRF) in 2024.

== School of Management and Entrepreneurship ==
School of Management and Entrepreneurship
- Type: Public business school
- Established: 2020
- Parent institution: Indian Institute of Technology Jodhpur
- Location: Jodhpur, Rajasthan, India
- NIRF Management (2025): 98
- Website: www.iitj.ac.in/schools/en/School-of-Management-&-Entrepreneurship

The School of Management and Entrepreneurship (SME) is a constituent business school of IIT Jodhpur, established in 2020 as part of the institute's expansion into management education.

It offers the following programmes:

- Master of Business Administration (MBA)
- MBA in Technology (MBA-Technology)
- PhD programmes in management-related disciplines

Admission to the MBA and MBA-Technology programmes is based on the Common Admission Test (CAT) and additional selection criteria.

In the IIRF 2025 Management rankings, the School of Management and Entrepreneurship was ranked 33rd among public colleges in India.

The school operates from the main campus of IIT Jodhpur.

== School of Design ==
School of Design
- Type: Design school
- Established: 2023
- Parent institution: Indian Institute of Technology Jodhpur
- Head: Dr. Sajan Pillai
- Website: www.iitj.ac.in/school-of-design/

The School of Design is a constituent academic unit of IIT Jodhpur, established in 2023.

The school offers the following postgraduate and research programmes:

- Master of Design (MDes) in Extended reality (XR) Design
- Master of Design (MDes) in Smart Product Design
- PhD in Design

Admission to the MDes programmes is based on the Common Entrance Examination for Design (CEED) scorecard for institute-sponsored seats, with additional selection criteria for self-sponsored seats, followed by a studio test and portfolio evaluation.

== Research ==
At IIT Jodhpur sponsored research and development programs were and are carried out in Centers of Excellence in the areas of information and communication technology, energy, and systems sciences. The French government had shown its interest in helping IIT Jodhpur develop its research and academic institute. IIT Jodhpur has signed an Agreement on Academic Exchanges and MoU with Nara Institute of Science and Technology, Japan.

== Student life ==
=== Cultural festivals ===
The annual inter-collegiate festival Ignus, usually held in the month of February is a cultural and technical festival hosted by the student body. It features competitions and events involving participants from all over the country, and concerts by eminent performers.

The annual inter-collegiate sports week, Varchas is another event organized by the student body. It involves participation from a number of institutes around the country in various sports competitions including athletics, badminton, basketball, football, cricket, chess, tennis, table tennis, volleyball and Jodhpur mini-marathon.

Students are also actively involved in activities like dramatics, literary arts, stargazing, music, quizzing, and fine arts. The Entrepreneurship Cell, which supports the growth of startups involves the student community in innovation and business activities as well.

== See also ==
- List of universities and higher education colleges in Jodhpur
- Indian Institutes of Technology
- Arid Forest Research Institute (AFRI) Jodhpur
