= List of universities and higher education colleges in Jodhpur =

Jodhpur (Rajasthan) is the second largest city in the Indian state of Rajasthan. Jodhpur has one of the largest concentrations of universities and higher education institutions.

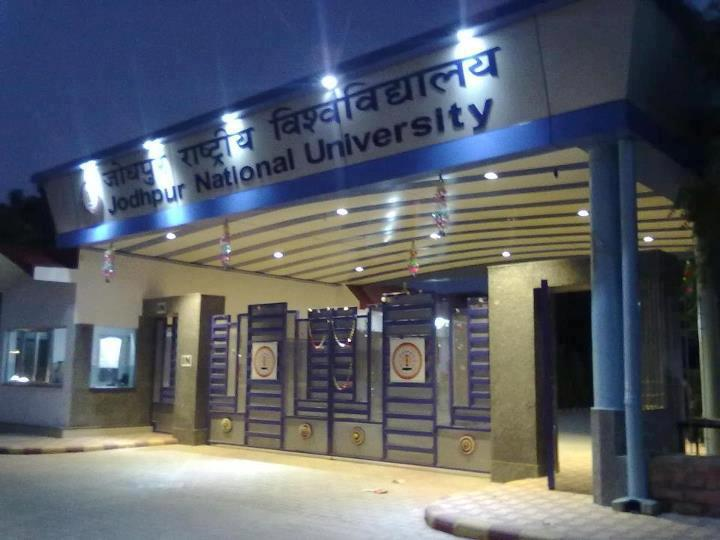
Jodhpur National University

== Universities ==
- Maulana Azad University, Jodhpur
- Agriculture University, Jodhpur
- Dr. Sarvepalli Radhakrishnan Rajasthan Ayurved University
- Jai Narain Vyas University
- Jodhpur National University
- Sardar Patel University of Police, Security and Criminal Justice
- MBM Engineering College (Now a University )
- Rajiv Gandhi Fintech University, Jodhpur
- Marwar Medical University, Jodhpur

== Higher education colleges ==
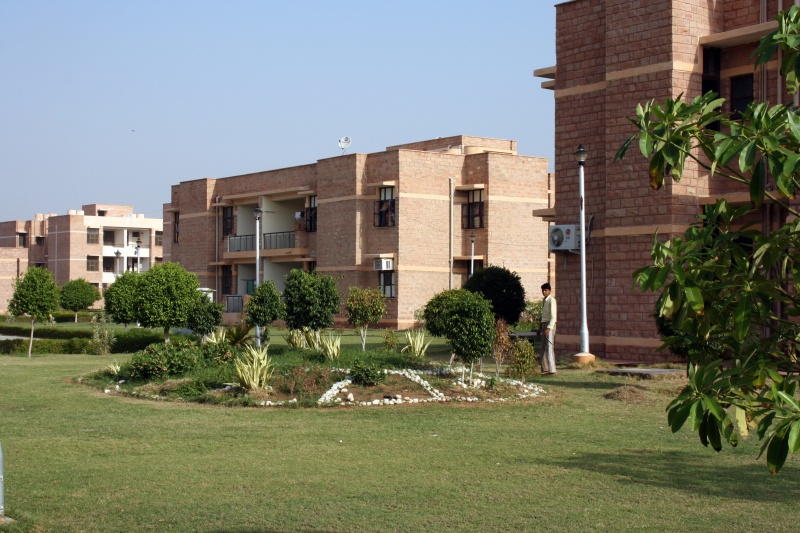
Indian Institute of Technology, Jodhpur

- Indian Institute of Technology Jodhpur
- M.B.M. University
- All India Institute of Medical Sciences Jodhpur
- National Law University, Jodhpur
- National Institute of Fashion Technology
- Indian Institute of Handloom Technology
- Dr. S.N. Medical College
- Jodhpur Institute of Engineering & Technology
- Vyas Institutes of Higher Education
- S.L.B.S Engineering College
- Mayurakshi Institute of Engineering & Technology
- Raj Engineering College
- Marwar Engineering College & Research Centre
- Onkarmal Somani College of Commerce
- Lachoo Memorial College of Science & Technology
- Aishwarya College of Education
- State institute of hotel management

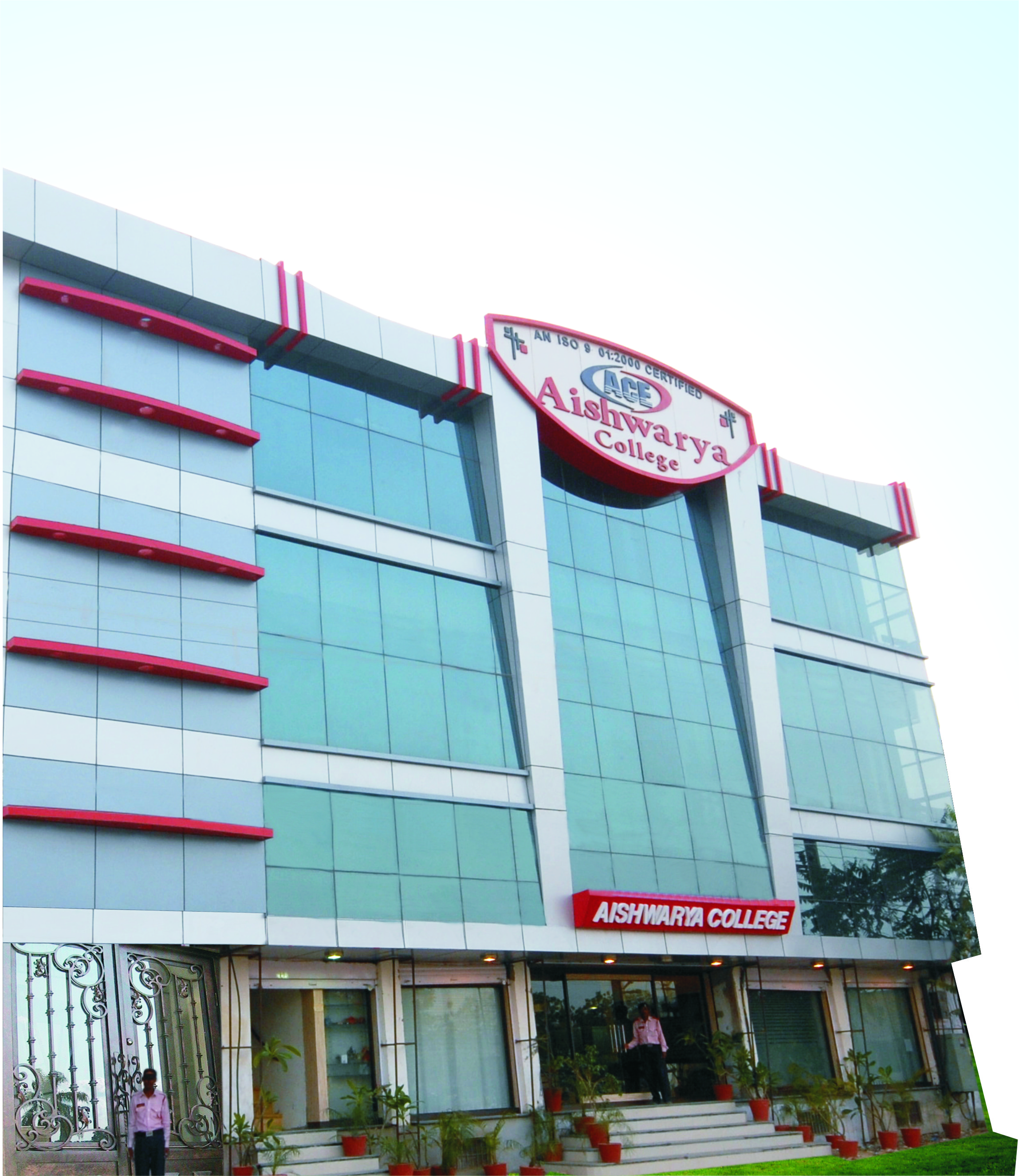
Aishwarya College of Education, Jodhpur

== See also ==
- Arid Forest Research Institute (AFRI) Jodhpur
- Rajasthan Technical University
- Jodhpur National University
