= JNU =

JNU may refer to:

- Jagannath University, Dhaka, Bangladesh
- Jaipur National University, Jaipur, Rajasthan, India
- Jawaharlal Nehru University, New Delhi, India
- Jeju National University, Jeju, South Korea
- Jeonnam National University, Kwangju, South Korea
- Jinan University, Guangzhou, Guangdong province, China
- Jodhpur National University, Jodhpur, Rajasthan, India
- Juneau International Airport (IATA code JNU), Juneau, Alaska
- JNU: Jahangir National University, a film about a fictional university
