= Rameshwar Nath Koul Bamezai =

Indian geneticist

R.N.K. Bamezai
- Born: 26 December 1951 (age 74); Srinagar, Jammu and Kashmir, India
- Education: All India Institute of Medical Sciences, New Delhi
- Known for: Human genetics, cancer genomics, bioinformatics, RNA interference
- Awards: Padma Shri (2012)
- Scientific career
- Workplaces: Jawaharlal Nehru University, National Centre of Applied Human Genetics, Shri Mata Vaishno Devi University
- Website: National Centre of Applied Human Genetics

Rameshwar Nath Koul Bamezai is an Indian scientist in the field of human genetics and cancer biology. He is the coordinator of the National Centre of Applied Human Genetics, School of Life Sciences, Jawaharlal Nehru University (New Delhi). He has served as the Vice chancellor of Shri Mata Vaishno Devi University. He was honoured with the Padma Shri Award by the President of India for his contributions to the fields of science and technology in 2012. An elected fellow of the National Academy of Medical Sciences, he has published many articles on his research.
