= Achal Das Bohra =

Indian engineer and educator

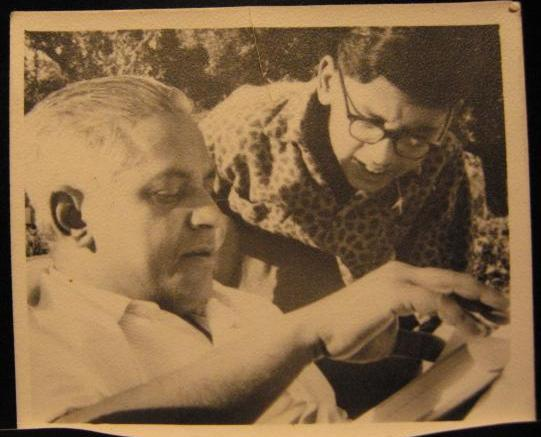
- Born: 23 December 1918; Jodhpur, Rajasthan, India
- Died: 17 February 2007 (aged 88)

Achal Das Bohra (23 December 1918 – 17 February 2007) was an Indian engineer, academician, author, educator and philanthropist. Bohra, affectionately known as "Papaji" and "Bohra Saab", was a leader of the Pushkarna Brahmin community in Rajasthan and a tireless advocate of women's rights and the balance of modernity and traditional Hindu philosophical thought.

== Personal ==
Bohra was born to Dau Das and Bachu Bohra and was the third of four children. He hailed from the town of Jodhpur, Rajasthan. His youngest sister died in childhood and he grew up with his two older sisters, Ashi and Gita, under the care of his father's sister. Bohra was married to Phool Kaur Purohit on 26 April 1934, but did not again meet her until October of that same year on Dashera day.

During his childhood, Bohra ran messages for Jai Narayan Vyas, a young freedom fighter and a future Chief Minister of Rajasthan, during the nascent Indian Independence movement.

Bohra identified three gurus who guided and heavily influenced him throughout his life—his gyan (knowledge) guru was Pandit Madan Mohan Malaviya, the founder of Banaras Hindu University, his karma (action) guru was Jai Narayan Vyas, and his dharma (faith) guru was Paramhans Shri 1008 Swami Hari Har Ji Maharaj, founder of the International Federation of Geeta Ashrams.

He is survived by five of his eight children, sixteen grandchildren, twenty great-grandchildren, and two great great-grandchildren dispersed across India and the United States.

== Education ==
Bohra graduated at the top of his class in 1941 from Banaras Hindu University (BHU) in Varanasi, India, with a double Bachelor of Science in Mechanical Engineering and Electrical Engineering. During his time at BHU, he was the recipient of the Prince of Wales gold medal and the Nageshwar Iyer Award. He also obtained 1st class certification from the City & Guilds of London Institute in Design and Performance of Electrical Machinery and Transformers.

== Professional life ==
From 1942 to 1946, after graduating from Banaras Hindu University, Bohra was the chief engineer, works manager and production engineer for Jay Engineering Works, a German stove company based in Calcutta, India. Shortly thereafter, Bohra was first a founder, then a professor, and later a principal at MBM Engineering College in Jodhpur.

Bohra worked in various capacities for the Government of India. He was first called to service during Partition to create camps for refugees from the then East Pakistan. It was during this time of great upheaval that he met and became an ally of Ms. Indira Gandhi, the daughter of Pandit Jawaharlal Nehru and the first woman Prime Minister of India. He also had the opportunity to open a dialogue with Sardar Vallabhbhai Patel and Sarvepalli Radhakrishnan, two of modern India's founding fathers and later home minister and president of the nation.

Bohra was chief planning officer and principal director of commercial projects administration for the Planning Commission of the Government India from 1952 to 1962. On his first official trip to the U.S. in this capacity in 1954, Bohra met with such personalities as Richard Nixon and Adlai Stevenson. Bohra served as India's expert in the International Labour Organization in Sri Lanka and Egypt from 1962 to 1969. He was also the senior industrial engineer and project manager for India's delegation on Labor and Development to the United Nations, a position which took him as far afield as Gazientep, Turkey, Nairobi, Kenya, and Colombo, Sri Lanka from 1969 to 1982.

He always returned to his home and community in Jodhpur and after finishing his formal service to his country, Bohra became the Technical Director and member of the Board of Directors of Alcobex Metals, Ltd, a premier manufacturer & exporter of seamless metal pipes, tubes, and extrusions that quickly gained national recognition.

== Civic service ==
Bohra was one of the founder-promoters of the MBM Engineering College (established on 15 August 1951), the Birla Institute of Technology & Science in Pilani (BITS), and the Jai Narain Vyas Mahila (P.G.) Mahavidhyalaya College in Jodhpur, one of two women-only colleges in the entire state of Rajasthan. Bohra was also on the governing body of the Lachoo Memorial College of Science and Technology in Jodhpur.

Bohra was the chairman of the Mahamana Malaviya Memorial Foundation, an organization committed to increasing the academic opportunities available to women in society.

Bohra served as the Secretary General of the International Federation of Geeta Ashrams, New Delhi, from 1974 to 1992. As a devotee of Paramhans Shri 1008 Swami Hari Har Ji Maharaj, he co-founded Geeta Dham on 84 acres (340,000 m^{2}) of land 40 km from Jodhpur which provides education to children, a home to the aged and a holistic approach to good health by the use of ancient doctrines of Ayurveda, Yoga and Meditation. Geetha Dham also provides a free eye camp twice a year to serve the needy for eye ailments, including cataracts and glaucoma.

Bohra established the Arogya Laboratory Center, a full-service diagnostic health care center for the destitute in the Old City of Jodhpur on the grounds of his ancestral home.

He was the main promoter and chairman of the Federation NG Social Organizations from 1992 to 1995 and the leader of the Center For Vedic Studies headquartered in Jodhpur. He was also the President of Rotary International in Jodhpur from 1971 to 1977.

== Memberships and honors ==
He was a member of Fellow Institution Engineers India and a member of the American Society for Testing and Materials, American Society of Metals and the International Tube Association.

Bohra was a member and was profiled in Marquis Who's Who in Asia (2007, 1st Edition), Marquis Who's Who in the World (1999–2007), Marquis Who's Who in Finance and Industry (2000–2001) and Marquis Who's Who in Science and Engineering (1998–2004), all of which are preeminent publications of the most noteworthy individuals in their respective fields and careers around the globe.
