= Avinash Kumar Agarwal =

Indian mechanical engineer and professor (born 1972)

- Born: 22 August 1972 (age 54); Karauli, Rajasthan, India
- Education: Malaviya Regional Engineering College, Jaipur (MREC); IIT Delhi
- Known for: Studies on internal combustion engines and CNG engines, Laser diagnostics, Renewable Fuels e.g. Methanol, Emission Control
- Awards: 2002 DST Young Scientist Award; 2004 AICTE Career Award; 2005 INAE Young Engineer Award; 2007 INSA Young Scientists Medal; 2007 UICT Alkyl Amine Young Scientist Award; 2008 SAE International Ralph R. Teetor Educational Award; 2011 IES C. V. Raman Young Teachers Award; 2012 NASI-Reliance Industries Platinum Jubilee Award; 2012 INAE Silver Jubilee Young Engineer Award; 2016 Shanti Swarup Bhatnagar Prize
- Scientific career
- Fields: Mechanical engineering; Tribology
- Workplaces: IIT Jodhpur; IIT Kanpur; Technical University of Vienna; University of Loughborough
- Doctoral advisor: L. M. Das

Avinash Kumar Agarwal (born 22 August 1972) is the director of the Indian Institute of Technology Jodhpur. He is an Indian mechanical engineer and academic known for his research in internal combustion engines, alternative fuels, and emissions control^{[1]}. He is a professor in the Department of Mechanical Engineering at the Indian Institute of Technology Kanpur (IIT Kanpur). Agarwal's work focuses on sustainable energy solutions, with contributions to the understanding and development of advanced combustion technologies and the utilization of biofuels. He has authored and co-authored numerous research publications and books in his field, and his work has been recognized with various awards. The Council of Scientific and Industrial Research, the apex agency of the Government of India for scientific research, awarded him the Shanti Swarup Bhatnagar Prize for Science and Technology, one of the highest Indian science awards for his contributions to Engineering Sciences in 2016.

Agarwal has received numerous fellowships. He was elected fellow of the American Society of Mechanical Engineering (2013), Society of Automotive Engineers, US (2012), National Academy of Science, Allahabad (2018), Royal Society of Chemistry, UK (2018), International Society for Energy, Environment and Sustainability (2016), and Indian National Academy of Engineering (2015).

Agarwal's research contributes to the advancement of cleaner and more efficient engine technologies, addressing pressing environmental concerns. He is among the top ten highly cited researchers (HCR) of 2018 from India, as per Clarivate Analytics, an arm of Web of Science.

== Biography ==
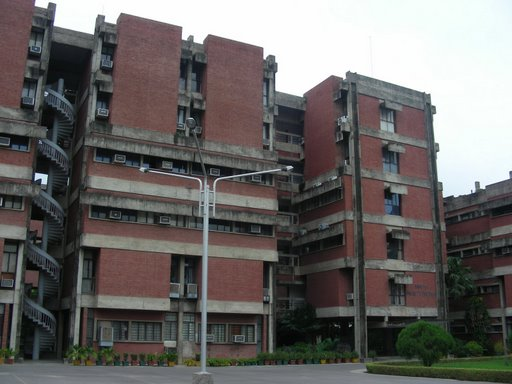
IIT Kanpur

Avinash Kumar Agarwal, born on 22 August 1972 at Karauli, in the Indian state of Rajasthan, earned his graduate degree in mechanical engineering (BE) from Malaviya Regional Engineering College (MREC) Jaipur (present-day Malaviya National Institute of Technology, Jaipur) of the University of Rajasthan in 1994 and did his master's degree at the Centre for Energy Studies of the Indian Institute of Technology, Delhi from where he obtained an MTech in energy studies in 1996. immediately after this, he pursued his PhD at IIT Delhi, in Center for energy studies, under the guidance of L. M. Das, which he successfully defended in 1999 for his thesis, Performance evaluation and tribological studies on a biodiesel-fuelled compression ignition engine. Thereafter he moved to the US for his postdoctoral work which he completed at the Engine Research Center of the University of Wisconsin-Madison between 1999 and 2001. On his return to India in March 2001, he joined the Indian Institute of Technology, Kanpur as an assistant professor. He was promoted as an associate professor in 2007 and has been serving the institute since 2012 as a professor at the Department of Mechanical Engineering. He had seven short stints abroad as visiting professor during this period, first at Wolfson School of Mechanical and Manufacturing Engineering of the University of Loughborough in 2002 second and third, at Photonics Institute of Technical University of Vienna in 2004 and 2013, and the fourth, fifth and sixth at Hanyang University, South Korea in 2013, 2014 and 2015 and the last stint at Korea Advanced Institute of Science and Technology (KAIST) in 2016. On 19 April 2024, he was appointed as the director of IIT Jodhpur.

Agarwal is married to Dr. Rashmi A. Agarwal and the couple has two children, Aditya (b. 2003) and Rithwik (b. 2006). The family lives in Kanpur in Uttar Pradesh.

== Legacy ==
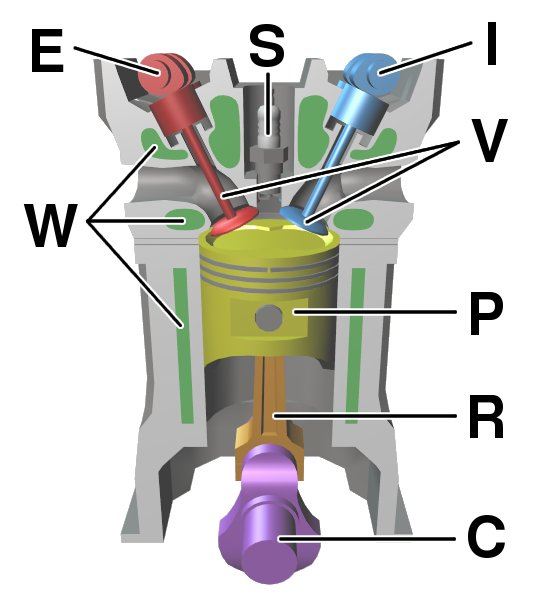
Four stroke engine diagram

Agrawal's researches has covered the fields of engine combustion, alternate fuels, emission and particulate control, optical diagnosis, Methanol Engine Development, fuel spray optimization and tribology and his work has assisted in the development of low-cost diesel oxidation catalysts and homogeneous charge compression ignition engines. His studies of laser ignition of methane-air hydrogen-air mixtures and biodiesel based on Indian feedstocks have widened the understanding of the subjects; he carried out a project on biodiesels during 2010–13 for the Department of Science and Technology of India. He has documented his researches by way of over 280 articles; Google Scholar and ResearchGate, online repositories of scientific articles, have listed many of them. Besides, he has edited forty books, most of which are published by Springer, including, Combustion for Power Generation and Transportation, and Novel Combustion Concepts for Sustainable Energy Development and has contributed forty two chapters to many books. He is also a co-editor of a five-volume reference text, Handbook of Combustion, published by Wiley-VCH in 2010.

Agarwal is the Associate Principle Editor of Journal "Fuel", Editor-in-chief of Journal of Energy and Environmental Sustainability (JEES) and is Associate Editor of two other journals, "ASME Journal of Energy Resources Technology", and "Journal of the Institution of Engineers (India): Series C". He is a member of the editorial board of several prestigious journals such as "International Journal of Engine Research, published by SAE International and IMechE, London, UK", Proceedings of the Institution of Mechanical Engineers, Part D: Journal of Automobile Engineering and Recent Patents on Mechanical Engineering of Bentham Science. He is also a former associate editor of the International Journal of Vehicle Systems Modelling and Testing of Inderscience Publishers, "International Journal of Oil, Gas and Coal Technology" (IJOGCT), Published by Inderscience Publishers and guest-edited a special issue of the Journal of Automobile Engineering on Alternative Fuels in 2007. He is a member of the Methanol Task Force of the Department of Science and Technology since 2017, former member of Technology Systems Group of the Department of Science and Technology and a former member of the Experts Group on Biofuels and Retrofitting of Engines of the Government of India. He is a member of the board of associates of the Internal Combustion Engines Division of American Society of Mechanical Engineering and is associated with SAE International, sitting in many of their review committees. He was the session organizer for 2005, 2006, 2007, 2008 and 2009 editions of SAE World Congress and chaired the 2004, 2005 and 2006 sessions on alternative fuel and internal combustion engines.

== Awards and honors ==
Agarwal received the Young Scientist Award of the Department of Science and Technology in 2002, followed by the Career Award for Young Teachers of the All India Council of Technical Education (AICTE) in 2004. The Young Engineer Award of the Indian National Academy of Engineering reached him in 2005 and the Young Scientists Medal of the Indian National Science Academy came his way in 2007. He received the Alkyl Amine Young Scientist Award of the Institute of Chemical Technology the same year and a year later, SAE International selected him for the 2008 Ralph R. Teetor Educational Award. He received the C. V. Raman Young Teachers Award of the IES Group in 2011 and NASI-Reliance Industries Platinum Jubilee Award of the National Academy of Sciences, India in 2012. The Indian National Academy of Engineering honored him again in 2012 with the Silver Jubilee Young Engineer Award, which was followed by "Rajib Goyal Prize" in Physical Sciences-2015 from Kurukshetra University and then Council of Scientific and Industrial Research awarded him the Shanti Swarup Bhatnagar Prize, one of the highest Indian science awards in 2016. Afterwards, he was conferred "Er. M P Baya National Award-2017" in Mechanical Engineering by Institution of Engineers, Udaipur and Clarivate Analytics India Research Excellence - Citation Award-2017, which was 6th Edition prize for high citations and high impact work from India, given by Clarivate Analytics.

Agarwal, who held the BOYSCAST Fellowship of Department of Science and Technology in 2002 and Devendra Shukla Research Fellowship of IIT Kanpur in 2009, was elected as a fellow by the Indian National Academy of Engineering in 2015. He is also a fellow of the American Society of Mechanical Engineers and SAE International, Royal Society of Chemistry, Indian National Academy of Engineering, National Academy of Sciences and International Society for Energy, Environment and Sustainability He was listed in several editions of Marquis Who's Who in Science and Engineering, Who's Who (Emerging Leaders) and Who's Who in the World. Agarwal was Poonam and Prabhu Goyal Chair Professor at IIT Kanpur from 2012 to 2016. In 2017, Avinash Kumar Agarwal was a laureate of the Asian Scientist 100 by the Asian Scientist. He was SBI Endowed chair Professor in the same institution (2018–2021).

== Selected bibliography ==
=== Books ===
- Environmental Contaminants, 431 pages, Published by Springer, Singapore (2018), (Eds.) Tarun Gupta, Avinash K Agarwal, Rashmi A Agarwal, Nitin K Labhsetwar (ISBN 978-981-10-7332-8) DOI: 10.1007/978-981-10-7332-8.
- Air Pollution and Control, 260 pages, Published by Springer, Singapore (2018), (Eds.) Nikhil Sharma, Avinash K Agarwal, Peter Eastwood, Tarun Gupta, Akhilendra P Singh (ISBN 978-981-10-7184-3) DOI: 10.1007/978-981-10-7185-0.
- Coal and Biomass Gasification, 521 pages, Published by Springer, Singapore (2018), (Eds.) Santanu De, Avinash K Agarwal, V S Moholkar, Thallada Bhaskar (ISBN 978-981-10-7334-2) DOI: 10.1007/978-981-10-7335-9.
- Droplets and Sprays, 430 pages, Published by Springer, Singapore (2018), (Eds.) Saptarshi Basu, Avinash K Agarwal, Achintya Mukhopadhyay, Chetan Patel (ISBN 978-981-10-7448-6) DOI: 10.1007/978-981-10-7449-3.
- Advances in Internal Combustion Engine Research, 345 pages, Published by Springer, Singapore (2018), (Eds.) Dhananjay K Srivastava, Avinash K Agarwal, Amitava Datta, Rakesh K Maurya (ISBN 978-981-10-7574-2) DOI: 10.1007/978-981-10-7575-9.
- Modeling and Simulations of Turbulent Combustion, 661 pages, Published by Springer, Singapore (2018), (Eds.) Santanu De, Avinash K Agarwal, Swetoprovo Chaudhuri, Swarnendu Sen (ISBN 978-981-10-7409-7) DOI: 10.1007/978-981-10-7410-3.
- Prospects of Alternative Transportation Fuels, 405 pages, Published by Springer, Singapore (2018), (Eds.) Akhilendra P Singh, Avinash K Agarwal, Rashmi A Agarwal, Atul Dhar, Mritunjay Kumar Shukla (ISBN 978-981-10-7517-9) DOI: 10.1007/978-981-10-7518-6.
- Environmental, Chemical and Medical Sensors, 409 pages, Published by Springer, Singapore (2018), (Eds.) Shantanu Bhattacharya, Avinash K Agarwal, Nripen Chanda, Ashok Pandey, Ashis Kumar Sen (ISBN 978-981-10-7750-0) DOI: 10.1007/978-981-10-7751-7.
- Applications of Solar Energy, 364 pages, Published by Springer, Singapore (2018), (Eds.) Himanshu Tyagi, Avinash K Agarwal, Prodyut R Chakraborty, Satvasheel Powar (ISBN 978-981-10-7205-5) DOI: 10.1007/978-981-10-7206-2.
- Bioremediation: Applications for Environmental Protection and Management, 411 pages, Published by Springer, Singapore (2018), (Eds.) Sunita J Varjani, Avinash K Agarwal, Edgard Ghansounou, Baskar Gurunathan (ISBN 978-981-10-7484-4) DOI: 10.1007/978-981-10-7485-1.
- Applications Paradigms of Droplet and Spray Transport: Paradigms and Applications, 379 pages, Published by Springer, Singapore (2018), (Eds.) Saptarshi Basu, Avinash K Agarwal, Achintya Mukhopadhyay, Chetan Patel (ISBN 978-981-10-7232-1) DOI: 10.1007/978-981-10-7233-8.
- Combustion for Power Generation and Transportation: Technology, Challenges and Prospects, 451 pages, Published by Springer, Singapore (2017), (Eds.) Avinash Kumar Agarwal, Santanu De, Ashok Pandey, Akhilendra Pratap Singh (ISBN 978-981-10-3784-9). DOI: 10.1007/978-981-10-3785-6.
- Locomotives and Rail Road Transportation: Technology, Challenges and Prospects, 247 pages, Published by Springer, Singapore (2017), (Eds.) Avinash Kumar Agarwal, Atul Dhar, Anirudh Gautam, Ashok Pandey (ISBN 978-981-10-3787-0). DOI: 10.1007/978-981-10-3788-7.
- Biofuels: Technology, Challenges and Prospects, 245 pages, Published by Springer, Singapore (2017), (Eds.) Avinash Kumar Agarwal, Rashmi Avinash Agarwal, Tarun Gupta, Bhola Ram Gurjar. DOI: 10-1007/978-981-10-3791-7 (ISBN 978-981-10-3790-0). DOI: 10.1007/978-981-10-3791-7.
- Technology Vision 2015: Technology Roadmap Transportation, 237 pages, (Eds.) Avinash Kumar Agarwal, S S Thipse, Akhilendra P Singh, Gautam Goswami, Mukti Prasad, Published by TIFAC, New Delhi, December 2016.
- Energy, Combustion and Propulsion: New Perspectives, 609 pages, Published by Athena Academic, London, UK (2016), (Eds.) Avinash K Agarwal, Suresh K. Aggarwal, Ashwani K. Gupta, Abhijit Kushari, Ashok Pandey (ISBN 978-19-1039-029-0)
- Novel Combustion Concepts for Sustainable Energy Development, 562 pages, Published by Springer, Singapore (2014), (Eds.) Avinash K. Agarwal, Ashok Pandey, Ashwani K. Gupta, Suresh K. Aggarwal, Abhijit Kushari. (ISBN 978-81-322-2210-1). DOI: 10.1007/978-81-322-2211-8-18.
- Handbook of Combustion, 5 Volumes, 3168 pages, Hardcover, April 2010, Published by Wiley VCH, (Eds.) Maximilian Lackner, Franz Winter, Avinash K. Agarwal (ISBN 978-3-527-32449-1).
- CI Engine Performance for Use with Alternative Fuels, 2009(SP-2237), 185 pages, Published by SAE International, US, 2009, (Eds.) Amiyo K Basu, Avinash Kumar Agarwal, Paul Richards, G. J. Thompson, Scott A Miers, Sundar Rajan Krishnan (ISBN 978-0-7680-2133-2).
- Combustion Science and Technology: Recent Trends Published by Narosa Publishing House, New Delhi, 2009 (Eds.) A. K. Agarwal, A. Kushari, S. K. Aggarwal, A. K. Runchal, 300 Pages (ISBN 978-81-8487-014-5).
- CI Engine Performance for use with Alternative Fuels (SP-2176), Published by SAE International, US, 2008, (Eds.) Avinash K. Agarwal, G. J. Thompson, Scott A. Miers, Sundar R. Krishnan (ISBN 978-0-7680-2018-2).
- Alternative Fuels and CI Engine Performance (SP-2067), 160 Pages, Published by SAE International, US, 2007, (Eds.) Avinash K. Agarwal, G. J. Thompson (ISBN 978-0-7680-1857-8).
- New Diesel Engines and Components and CI Engine performance for Use with Alternative Fuels (SP-2014), 171 Pages, Published by SAE International, US, 2006, (Eds.) A. Jain, J. E. Mossberg, Avinash K. Agarwal, G. J. Thompson (ISBN 0-7680-1749-1).
- CI Engine performance for Use with Alternative Fuels, and New Diesel Engines and Components (SP-1978), 196 Pages, Published by SAE International, US, 2005, (Eds.) J. E. Mossberg, A. Jain, G. J. Thompson, Avinash K. Agarwal (ISBN 0-7680-1623-1).

=== Articles ===
- Avinash K Agarwal*, Bushra Ateeq, Tarun Gupta, Akhilendra P. Singh, Swaroop K Pandey, Nikhil Sharma, Rashmi A Agarwal, Neeraj K. Gupta, Hemant Sharma, Ayush Jain, Pravesh C Shukla, "Toxicity and mutagenicity of exhaust from compressed natural gas: Could this be a clean solution for megacities with mixed-traffic conditions?”, Environmental Pollution. 239, 499–511, 2018.doi: 10.1016/j.envpol.2018.04.028
- Avinash Kumar Agarwal (2007). "Biofuels (alcohols and biodiesel) applications as fuels for internal combustion engines". Progress in Energy and Combustion Science. 33 (3): 233–271. doi:10.1016/j.pecs.2006.08.003.
- Deepak Agarwal; Lokesh Kumar; Avinash Kumar Agarwal (2008). "Performance evaluation of a vegetable oil fuelled compression ignition engine". Renewable Energy. 33 (6): 1147–1156. doi:10.1016/j.renene.2007.06.017.
- Avinash Kumar Agarwal, K. Rajamanoharan (2009). "Experimental investigations of performance and emissions of Karanja oil and its blends in a single cylinder agricultural diesel engine". Applied Energy. 86 (1): 106–112. doi:10.1016/j.apenergy.2008.04.008.
- Joonsik Hwang; Choongsik Bae; Chetankumar Patel; Avinash Kumar Agarwal (2016). "An Experimental Investigation on Spray Characteristics of Waste Cooking Oil, Jatropha, and Karanja Biodiesels in a Constant Volume Combustion Chamber". SAE International Technical Papers. SAE Technical Paper Series. 1. doi:10.4271/2016-01-2263.

== See also ==
- Diesel fuel
- Vegetable oil
