= Bharat B. Chattoo =

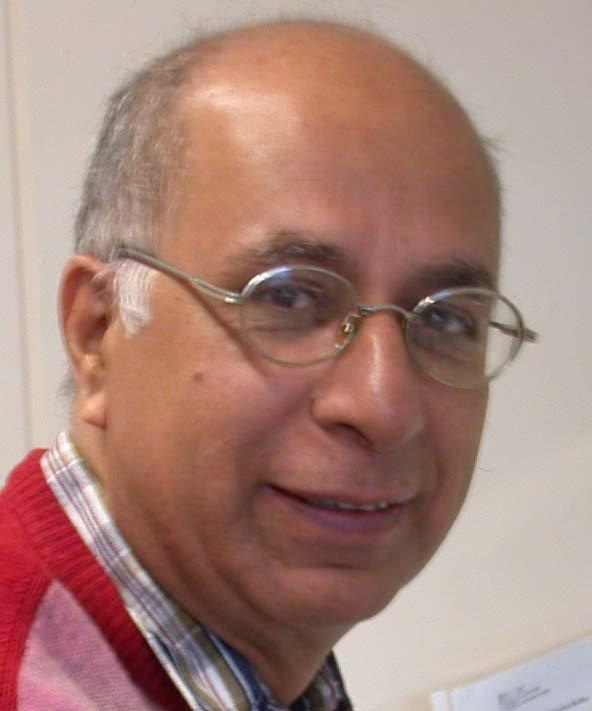
Prof Bharat B Chattoo, J C Bose National Fellow, Eminent Scientist

Bharat B. Chattoo (25 May 1951 – 15 November 2016), a JC Bose National Fellow, was a scientist specialising in the field of Biotechnology, Genomics and Proteomics.

Chattoo was responsible for establishment of Shri Mata Vaishno Devi University, Jammu, as the Founding Vice-Chancellor, between 19 August 2001 and 31 August 2004 right from the initial conceptualisation stage.

This university which began its academic programmes in 2004 was established under an Act of the Jammu & Kashmir legislature as a residential and highly technical university.

== Early life and career ==
Bharat B. Chattoo was born in post-independence India, on the auspicious occasion of Jyeshtha Ashtami, to Pt Shivjee Nath Chattoo and Smt Jaya Chattoo, residents of Ali Kadal, Srinagar, India. After initial years of home schooling under the guidance of his father, maternal uncles and cousins, Bharat proceeded to complete his BSc (1968) and MSc (1971) from the University of Jammu and Kashmir, India. He then completed his PhD in the field of Microbial Genetics from the University of Delhi in 1976.

Chattoo was then appointed the Co-ordinator at the Centre of Biosciences, at the University of Roorkee In 1982, Chattoo had a brief stint at the Centre for Cellular and Molecular Biology, Hyderabad, India.

Thereafter, later that year, Chattoo moved overseas to Basel, where he was associated with the Frederich Meischer Institute for Biomedical Research and Ciba-Geigy.

In 1986, Chattoo moved back to India and joined the academia, taking up a position at the prestigious Maharaja Sayajirao University, Vadodara, Gujarat.

== Academic career ==
In 1986 he joined the faculty of Maharaja Sayajirao University (MSU) as Professor and became Head of the Department of Microbiology (1996–2001) and the Director of Centre for Genome Research of the University (Now renamed as the Dr Bharat Chattoo Genome Research Centre), since 2001.

From August 2001 to 2004 he also took responsibility as the Founding Vice-Chancellor of Shri Mata Vaishno Devi University (Jammu) to conceptualize and establish the new University, at Katra, near Jammu.

In the meantime, at Baroda he established a Cluster Innovation Centre to encourage the interface of industry and entrepreneurship in Gujarat.

His laboratory has successfully expressed therapeutic proteins of pharmaceutical interest such as Hepatitis B surface antigen and human epidermal growth factor in non-conventional yeasts and transferred the know-how to the industry.

He received the National Technology award at the Technology Day Programme on 11 May 2001 from the Vice President of India for transfer of technologies to the industry. He was awarded the Rockefeller Foundation Biotechnology career fellowship and the STA fellowship from Japan Science and Technology Corporation.

His active research collaborations included Federal Institute of Technology] (ETH), Zurich (for bioprocess development, reactor design, bioprocess control and automation under Indo-Swiss Collaboration in Biotechnology); International Rice Research Institute (IRRI), Salk Institute for Biological Studies, John Innes Institute, Weizmann Institute of Science (for cooperation in bioinformatics sponsored by UNESCO and DBT, GoI and Indian industrial partners); University of Leeds and the Weizmann Institute of Science; the Rice Genome Programme, Tsukuba (for molecular mapping and genome analysis in rice), National Institute of Bioscience and Human Technology, Tsukuba; Tel-Aviv University, Israel.

He served on several expert committees of the Government of India and was a member of the Gujarat Biotechnology Council.

Prof Chattoo was the team leader of the first Indian team that participated in the International Biology Olympiad held at Antalya, Turkey in 2000.

== Awards and fellowships ==
He has been awarded a Centre of Excellence and Innovation under the Category of ‘Outstanding Scientist Research Programme in Biotechnology’, by the Department of Biotechnology, New Delhi in 2009.

Recipient of Acharya J. C. Bose National Fellowship from the Department of Science and Technology 2009

Recipient of the Raja Ramanna Fellowship in 2014

Lifetime Achievement Award in 2013 on behalf of an International Rice Blast Research Community, in Korea

He received the National Technology award at the Technology Day Programme on 11 May 2001 from the Vice President of India for transfer of technologies to the industry.

He was awarded the Rockefeller Foundation Biotechnology career fellowship and the STA fellowship from Japan Science and Technology Corporation

A Fellow of the Indian National Science Academy (INSA), New Delhi

A Fellow of Indian Academy of Sciences (IASc), Bengaluru

A Fellow of the National Academy of Agricultural Sciences (NAAS), New Delhi

A Fellow of the National Academy of Sciences, India (NASI) Allahabad;

An Elected Member of the Guha Research Conference (GRC)

An Elected Member of The World Academy of Sciences (TWAS)

A Member of the Genetics Society of America, International Society of Plant Molecular Biology, American Society of Microbiology, Society of Biological Chemists-India, National Science Foundation Bi-national (US-Israel) Grants Review Panel, Review Panel of Swiss National Science Foundation, Review Panel of Indo-Swedish Collaboration in Biotechnology,

On the Board of Governors of Vikram A. Sarabhai Community Science Centre Society, Ahmedabad

Chair of Expert Advisory Committee for the Biotechnology Initiatives of the State Government of Gujarat, Gujarat Biotechnology Council, Governing Council of Gujarat Biotechnology Mission, Society of Cell Biology, etc.

Coordinator and senior member of the National Assessment and Accreditation Council.

== Personal life ==
Chattoo is survived by his wife, daughter and son. The physicist Predhiman Krishan Kaw and Chattoo are cousins.
