= Bhupender Singh (officer) =

Indian army officer and recipient of Shaurya Chakra

Major Bhupender Singh SC
- Born: 25 October 1952; Rajasthan, India
- Died: 23 January 1994 (aged 41); Kashmir, India
- Education: MBM Engineering College; Military Training; Indian Military Academy
- Spouse: Avinash Kaur
- Children: Nimrat & Rubina
- Military career
- Allegiance: India
- Branch: Indian Army
- Service years: 1978 — 1994
- Rank: Major
- Service number: IC-35010
- Unit: 64 Engineer Regiment
- Awards: Shaurya Chakra; Sword of Honour (IMA)

Major Bhupender Singh, SC (25 October 1952 – 23 Jan 1994) was an officer of the Indian Army who was killed by Hizbul Mujahideen on 23 January 1994. He was posthumously awarded Shaurya Chakra.

== Early life and education ==
Bhupender was born on 25 October 1952 in Rajasthan, India. He completed Civil Engineering from MBM Engineering College, Jodhpur.

== Military career ==
Bhupendra was commissioned in 64 Engineer Regiment in 1978 and he was a recipient of the coveted Sword of Honour. (Note: Awarded to the best cadet of a course.) Throughout his career, he served in various units which includes Combat Engineers, Military Engineering Service (MES), Military Survey and the Defence Research & Development Organization. Before his death, he was the Officer Commanding of 99 Road Construction Company.

== Death ==
Bhupender was stationed at Verinag as Officer Commanding of 99 Road Construction Company. In the early January 1994, Bhupender along with two officers and 13 soldiers went on a recce. Upon entering Akkar village, they were ambushed by militants who directly attacked them. Despite breaking the ambush and continuing the mission, on 17 January 1994, he was kidnapped by Hizbul Mujahideen. They demanded release of some terrorists, which Bhupender denied. Hearing his denials, the terrorists killed him on 23 January 1994.

== Shaurya Chakra ==
Acknowledging Bhupender's bravery, the Government of India posthumously awarded Shaurya Chakra to Bhupender . It was presented to his daughter Nimrat on 13 March.

The Shaurya Chakra citation reads as follows:

CITATION

MAJOR BHUPENDER SINGH

99 Road Construction Company (IC 35010)

Maj Bhupender Singh employed as OC 99 Road Constr Coy in Project Beacon, was responsible for the task of constructing five bailey bridges on road Khannabal-Pahalgam of J&K in Pursuance of the decision taken at a high-level meeting chaired by Shri Rajesh pilot, Maj Bhupender Singh accompanied by a party consisting of two officers and 13 Ors including escorts went on the recce of the bridge sites. At village Akkar, the recce party ran into an ambush by ANEs who were lying in wait at a roadblock created by them. the party was fired from all around from a very close range by automatic weapons with an estimated strength of 100 ANEs. Showing great presence of mind, Maj Bhupender Singh deployed his troops without any loss of time and returned the fire. After a prolonged exchange of fire, he successfully broke through the ambush along with his party and proceeded ahead. On 17 Jan 1994, Maj Bhupender Singh was kidnapped by ANEs. He remained in their captivity for a week and was killed by them on 23 Jan 1994. Maj Bhupender Singh displayed gallantry exemplary cool courage, unflinching devotion to duty, and consuming passion for the safety of his men at the cost of his life. He has set an example for others to emulate.
