= Vishal Garg =

Indian researcher

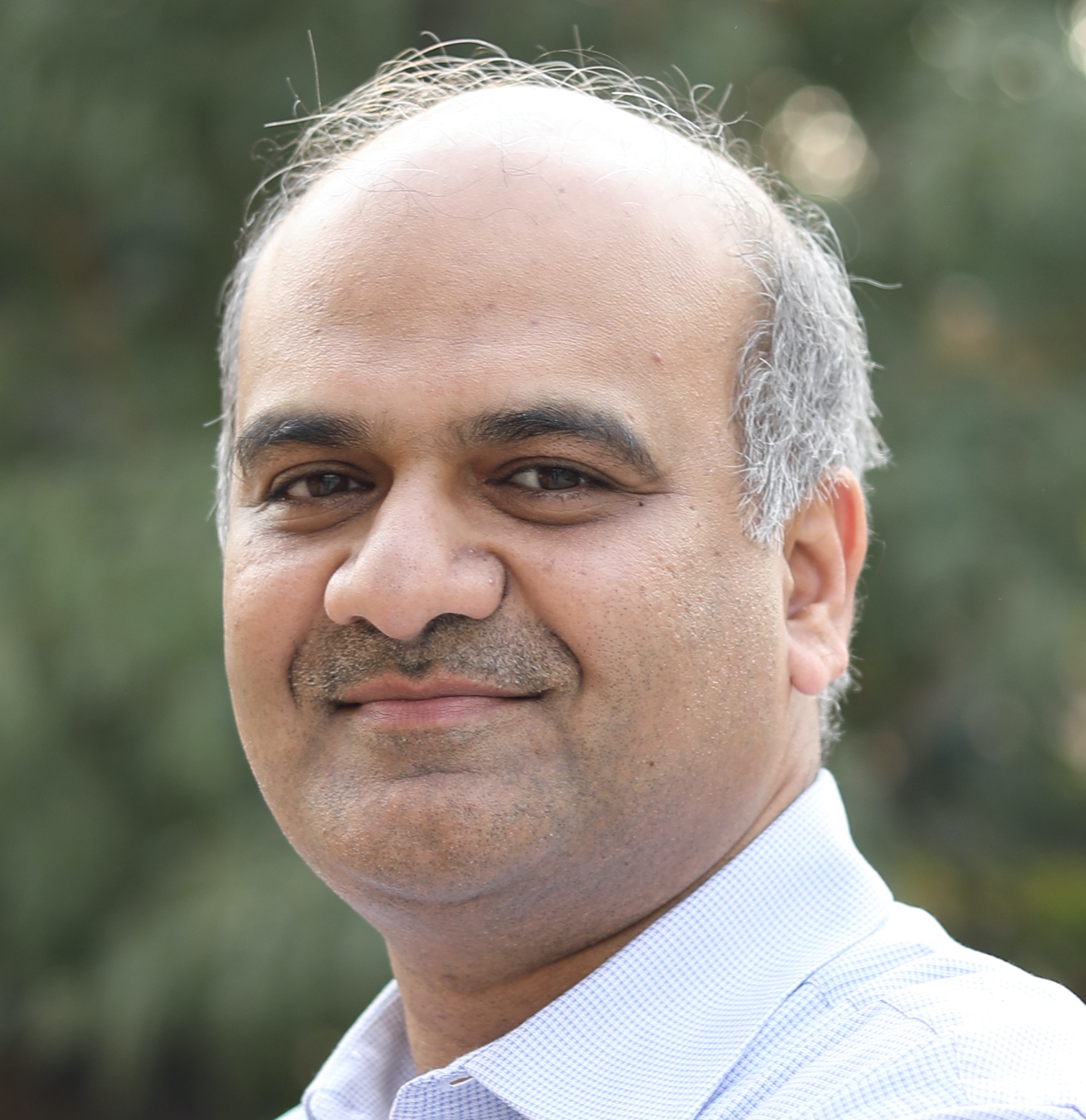
- Born: June 1973 (age 53); Jodhpur, Rajasthan, India
- Education: M.B.M. Engineering College, Jodhpur; IIT Delhi
- Awards: Dr. Arthur H. Rosenfeld Urban Cooling Achievement Award (2018)
- Scientific career
- Fields: Building Energy Efficiency, Cool Roofs
- Workplaces: International Institute of Information Technology, Hyderabad
- Doctoral advisor: N. K. Bansal
- Website: https://www.iiit.ac.in/people/faculty/vishal/

Vishal Garg is an Indian researcher working mainly in building energy efficiency and Cool Roofs. Garg is University Chair Professor and Dean Academics at Plaksha University. Previously he was Professor and Head of the Center for IT in Building Science at the International Institute of Information Technology, Hyderabad. He is the recipient of the inaugural Dr. Arthur H. Rosenfeld Urban Cooling Achievement Award. He is actively involved in supporting the formulation of national-level policies and standards and implementation of building energy codes in India, and was made a Fellow of IBPSA in 2019.

== Early life and education ==
Garg was born in Jodhpur and raised in Jaipur. He attended M.B.M. Engineering College, Jodhpur of the J.N. Vyas University where he received his Bachelor of Engineering in 1995. He pursued his Ph.D. at IIT Delhi, in the Center for Energy Studies, under the guidance of Prof. N. K. Bansal, which he successfully defended in 2000. He joined the International Institute of Information Technology, Hyderabad as Assistant Professor & Founding Head of Center for IT in Building Science in March 2000. He has worked on several large international projects in the area of building energy efficiency.

== Awards and honors ==
- Fellow, International Building Performance Simulation Association, 2019.
- Dr. Arthur H Rosenfeld Urban Cooling Achievement Award, 2018.
- Fellow, Indian Green Building Council, 2016.
- Life Fellow, Indian Society of Lighting Engineers, 2013.
