= Prem Shanker Goel =

Indian space scientist (born 1947)

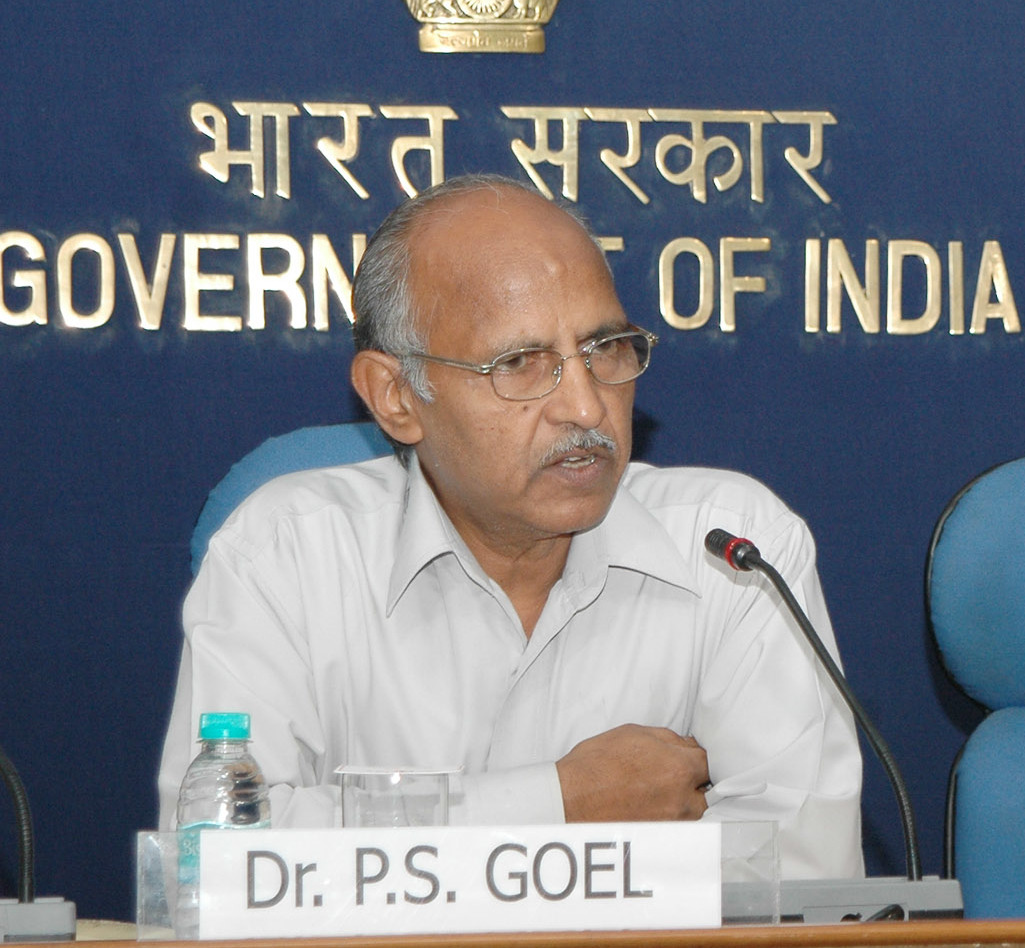
- P. S. Goel in 2007
- Born: 20 April 1947 (age 78); Jodhpur, Rajputana Agency, British Raj
- Education: (B.E.)M.B.M. University (ME)IISc Bangalore (PhD)Bangalore University
- Awards: Padma Shri; VASVIK Industrial Research Award; Om Prakash Bhasin Award; ASI Lifetime Achievement Award; ISRO Distinguished Scientist Award; ISRO Special Achievement Award; Dr. Vikram Sarabhai Research Award

Prem Shanker Goel (born 20 April 1947) is an Indian space scientist, former secretary at the Department of Ocean Development, Ministry of Earth Sciences, Government of India and a former director of Indian Space Research Organization. He was honored by the Government of India, in 2001, with the fourth highest Indian civilian award of Padma Shri.

== Biography ==
Born on 20 April 1947 in the Rajputana Agency of the British Raj (now the Indian state of Rajasthan), he graduate from M.B.M. University, secured a post graduate degree (ME) in Applied Electronics and Servomechanism from the Indian Institute of Science, Bangalore (IISc) and continued at Bengaluru to complete his PhD from the Bangalore University. He started his career by joining the Indian Space Research Organization at their centre in Thiruvananthapuram in the project for Satellite Attitude Control System for spinning RS-1 satellite but later shifted to the Bengaluru centre to join the Aryabhata (satellite) team.

Over the years, Goel has served as the chairman of the Spacecraft System Advisory Board for IRS-1, the project engineer of the Attitude and Orbitalal Control Subsystem of the Ariane Passenger Payload Experiment, associate project director of INSAT-2, head of the control system, group director of Attitude and Orbitalal Control Subsystem, deputy director of Mission and Control Area, associate director and later, the director of ISRO satellite system. On his retirement from ISRO in 2005, he was appointed as the Secretary of the Department of Ocean Development, a post he held till 2008. During his tenure there, the department was developed into a full-fledged ministry, Ministry of Earth Sciences, by combining the departments of ocean, atmosphere, geoscience and atmosphere. The next move was as the Chairman of Recruitment and Assessment Centre of the Defence Research and Development Organisation. He is the incumbent Honorary Distinguished Professor at ISRO and holds the Professor M. G. K. Menon DRDO Chair.

Goel is credited with the development of the spin axis orientation system for Bhaskara I and Bhaskara II satellites and the magnetic control for spinning satellites. His contributions are also reported in the Ariane Passenger Payload Experiment project in the development of momentum based III-axis control system, in the IRS-V project in the development of zero momentum biased III-axis control system and in the INSAT-II project in the development of configuration momentum biased attitude control system. He has also been involved in the development of TES, SRE missions and other communication and scientific missions.

The first chairman of the Earth Commission, a global forum of scientists. and a member of several professional organizations such as the International Academy of Astronautics, Paris and the Indian National Academy of Engineering, Goel has over 100 scientific papers to his credit, published in peer-reviewed national and international journals. He has also attended many conferences and seminars to deliver keynote addresses.

== Awards and recognitions ==
Prem Shanker Goel is an elected Fellow of the Indian National Science Academy, National Academy of Sciences, India, The Academy of Sciences for the Developing World, the Aeronautical Society of India and the Indian Academy of Sciences He is also an honorary Fellow of the Electrochemical Society of India, and the Indian Institute of Technology, Mumbai.

Goel received the Special Achievement Award in 1975 for the Aryabhata project and Hari Om Ashram Prerit Dr. Vikram Sarabhai Research Award in 1983. In 1992, he was awarded the ASI Lifetime Achievement Award by the Aeronautical Society of India. The same year, he received the VASVIK Industrial Research Award followed by Om Prakash Bhasin Award in 1995. The Government of India awarded him the civilian honour of Padma Shri in 2001. He is also a recipient of ISRO Distinguished Scientist Award.

== See also ==
- Department of Ocean Development
- Indian Space Research Organization
- Bhaskara I
- Bhaskara II
