= N. K. Bansal =

Indian academic (1943–2020)

Narendra Kumar Bansal
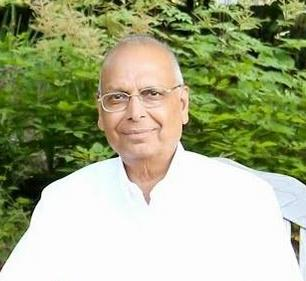
- Born: Narendra Kumar Bansal; 11 December 1943; Bundi, Rajasthan
- Died: 4 February 2020 (aged 76)
- Other name: N.K Bansal
- Occupation: Professor
- Known for: Contributions in energy and environment
- Scientific career
- Doctoral students: Vishal Garg

N K Bansal (Narendra Kumar Bansal) (December 1943 – February 2020) was a former Head and Senior Professor of Centre for Energy Studies at the Indian Institute of Technology (IIT) Delhi, and a Vice-Chancellor of Shri Mata Vaishno Devi University (SMVDU). Bansal was the recipient of the fellowship of the German Academic Exchange Service as well as holder of the Alexander von Humboldt Fellowship from Germany, and his work on climatic zones and passive building design is used extensively by researchers and practitioners.

== Family ==
Narendra Kumar Bansal was married to Shaila Bansal. They had three daughters; Shalini, Pooja and Sweta, whom he wanted to make independent working women through education from Delhi Public School, and later Arizona State University for higher studies. Shaila Bansal suffered through multiple cancers, including pancreatic cancer during her lifetime.

Bansal's wife Shaila Bansal died in October 2019, and they are survived by their three daughters.

== Early life and education ==
Narendra Kumar Bansal was born to Om Prakash Gupta and Prem Lata on 11 December 1943 to a family of academics. His father was a retired teacher and his mother established a school to teach young kids. He was one of seven kids; four boys, two girls and one adopted sibling.

Narendra Kumar Bansal started 11th grade at the age of 13 and graduated high school at the age of 15, after which he went to Banaras Hindu University for a medical degree. However, due to an autoimmune disorder, he had to leave the program and was hospitalized at the All India Medical Institute (AIIMS) in Delhi for a year. After his recovery, he went on to complete his Bachelor's in Science (BSC) degree from Agra University at the age of 20, and later a Master's in Science (MSC) degree from IIT Delhi in 1966, and a Doctorate in Physics from the same institute in 1969.

He was a champion in badminton and table tennis and loved to play pranks on his siblings. He was known for his good sense of humor in the family.

== Academic career ==
In 1970, Narendra Kumar Bansal joined St. Stephen's College as a lecturer where he remained for five years, later leaving for Germany in 1975 for his post-doctoral work in the field of nuclear energy. On his return, Bansal shifted his focus to renewable energy, energy efficiency in buildings, energy planning models, and environmental systems analysis.

Bansal joined the Centre of Energy Studies at IIT Delhi in the year 1979, where he made contributions to the development of the curriculum, laboratories, and collaborative national and international projects, and was elevated to the post of Chief Scientific Officer in 1988 and later to Professor in 1991. He served as the head of the Centre of Energy Studies during 1997-1999 before retiring.

=== Germany ===
In December 1975, Bansal travelled to Karlsruhe for the German Academic Exchange Service. After undergoing a course in German at the Goethe Institute in Freiburg, he joined the research center in Karlsruhe on 1 April 1976. In February, he met his Chief Scientific Advisor to arrange an apartment for his family and he realized his work on nuclear safety would not be appropriate for university teachings in India. After his return to India in 1977, he started working instead in the field of solar energy.

On a number of occasions, Bansal was invited as a lecturer by the Aachen Polytechnic University as well as the universities of Essen, Kassel and Siegen. He was elected to the Scientific Advisory Board of the institutional working group "Solar and other renewable technologies", founded by Michael Meliss, whom he later grew close to. His various visits to Germany and his numerous projects in solar photovoltaic energy and environmental analysis were funded by the German Ministry of Research and Technology

=== Establishment of SMVDU ===
On 15 November 2004, the governor of Jammu and Kashmir invited Bansal to further the establishment of SMVDU. Bansal joined as Vice Chancellor and modelled the university after IIT Delhi. During his tenure until 2009, the university achieved national and international recognition. Bansal started various programs in the disciplines of science, management, energy, humanities and social sciences. Upon Narendra Bansal's death, a vigil was held in his remembrance in the central courtyard of the university.

== Industrial experience ==
He later returned to Germany, this time at the Research Center Juelich in the field of solar energy, working in the field of solar thermal technologies, energy efficient buildings, and energy economics planning. He wrote the book The Climate Zones of India and Passive Building Design: A Handbook of Natural Climate Control with G. Minke and G. Hauser, which later became the standard work in the field.

Bansal has served as a board member, member of expert groups, or as a consultant for entities including Sintex Plastics Technology Limited, Tata Consultancy Services, Punjab Agro Industries and Ronak Industries. He also served as consultant to governmental and non-governmental agencies such as the Ministry of Non-Conventional Energy Resources, the Tata Energy Research Institute, the Swedish Energy Development Agency, the Ministry of Economic Cooperation, and the Planning Commission of India and Germany.

After completing his tenure at SMVDU, Bansal returned to Delhi and was invited by the Ministry of New and Renewable Energy as a HR consultant to develop a course curriculum for all national institutions at various levels. Simultaneously, he was offered an industry chair, Sintex Chair Professor, at CEPT University with the option to operate from Delhi, a position he accepted and remained in until his retirement in May, 2019.

== Later life and death ==
In October 2019, his wife's condition deteriorated, ending in her death on the 24 October 2019. He also suffered a spinal injury and later developed pneumonia in January 2020. He was admitted to Max Saket and was later put on a ventilator. He died after 4 days on the ventilator, on 4 February 2020.

== Legacy ==
Bansal has experience spanning over 41 years of teaching and R&D work in the field of renewable energy. He is the author and editor of more than 20 books, 16 reviews and more than 300 publications in international journals. Bansal has assisted 35 students with their Ph.Ds and 40 students with their MTech degree along with a number of international students, and has lectured in Germany, the USA, the UK, and Sweden. He served as a consultant for US AID, the German Technical Cooperation Society and other industries in India and abroad. He has been a member of the Scientific Advisory Committee of a German state, a board member of Solar-Institut Jülich, and on the advisory board member of a European project on future climate coordinated by the Demark Engineering Association.

Bansal's students plan to start a memorial lecture series in his honor in 2021. A book written by his students, Building Energy Simulation: A Workbook Using DesignBuilderTM, has been dedicated to Narendra Bansal.

=== Awards ===
- Dr. C. M. Jacob Gold Medal (System Society of India, 1991)
- Pioneer in Renewable Energy (WREN 1996, Florence, Italy)
- Solar Pioneer from India (German magazine 2004)
- Life Time Achievement Award in Education (2005)
- Rajiv Gandhi Shiromani Award
- Amity Excellence Award (2008)
- Holder of Alexander Von Humboldt Fellowship and DAAD Fellowship of Germany.
