= Shri Mata Vaishno Devi University =

Central University in Jammu, India

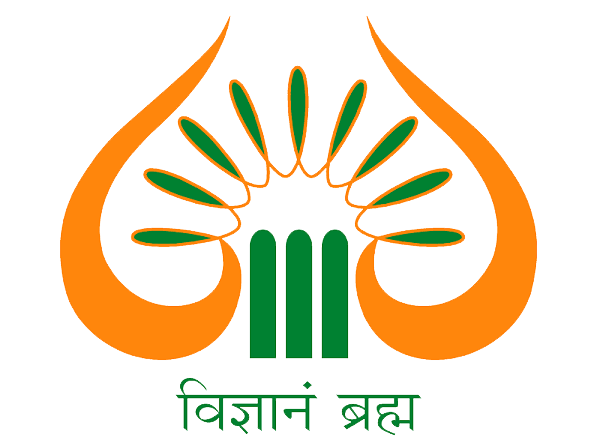
- Official Logo of SMVDU
- Motto: Vijñānaṃ brahma
- Motto in English: "God is Science"
- Type: Public University
- Established: May 12, 1999; 27 years ago
- Accreditation: NAAC
- Academic affiliations: UGC, NMC, AICTE, COA, NIRF, AIU
- Chancellor: Lieutenant Governor of Jammu and Kashmir
- Vice-Chancellor: Dr. Pragati Kumar
- Students: 5500+
- Location: SMVDU Campus, Sub Post Office, Kakryal, Katra, Jammu and Kashmir, 182320, India
- Campus: 470 acres (190 ha); Urban
- Website: www.smvdu.ac.in

Shri Mata Vaishno Devi University, commonly referred to as SMVD University or SMVDU, is a Government Owned Higher Institution/University located in Katra, Reasi district, Jammu and Kashmir, India. It was founded in 1999, as fully residential and technical university, a Public University recognised by UGC under section 2(f) and 12(B) and is established on more than an 470-acre (190 ha) residential and provides technical education in the field of engineering, architecture, science, management, philosophy and other subjects, with all technical courses recognised by AICTE, University Grants Commission (India), National Board of Accreditation and Council of Architecture.

Shri Mata Vaishno Devi University was ranked in the 100–150 category by the National Institutional Ranking Framework (NIRF) university ranking in 2020. The College of Engineering was ranked 78 by the NIRF engineering ranking in 2020. SMVDU is ranked 80th globally and 3rd within India in the Times Higher Education Impact Ranking 2021 under the UNSDG category 07. SMVDU is also ranked in the 6th-25th Rank band in the government aided institutions category in the Atal Ranking of Institutions on Innovation achievements ARIIA 2020 Ranking of government of India. TIMES HIGHER EDUCATION in their World University Rankings 2024 Ranked SMVDU in the band of 800–1000 in the World and 25th in Best Universities in India. SMVDU is one of those prominent institutes in the world whose Scientists are in the Stanford University's List of 2% & 5% Scientist in the World. In Times Higher Education's Asia University Rankings 2024 SMVDU stands in the 251-300th band, THE Asia University Rankings 2024 ranking includes 739 universities from 31 territories in Asia. In THE Young University Ranking 2024 SMVDU ranked 201-250th Band and ranking includes 673 universities all over the World.

Located at a distance of 45 km (28 mi) from Jammu Airport and 14 km (8.7 mi) short of the town of Katra, the university is situated on a plateau surrounded by mountains on three sides in the foothills of the Trikuta range where the shrine of Mata Vaishno Devi is located. It is a self-contained township with most facilities available in-house.

== History ==
In 1998, the people of Jammu region supported the establishment of Shri Mata Vaishno Devi University. This turned into a movement which lasted for around two months. Various students, traders, lawyers and various communities joined this movement. A 17-day-long strike was observed for the cause. Ultimately, Shri Mata Vaishno Devi University (SMVDU) was established under the Jammu and Kashmir Shri Mata Vaishno Devi University Act, 1999, as an autonomous, highly technical and fully residential university. The Shri Mata Vaishno Devi Shrine Board owned and funded the construction of the university. The site, spread over an area of 470 acres, was procured from Kakryal village, a flat hill across Jhajjar stream from National Highway 1A (now NH44).This university is owned by Government.

Chancellors
- Girish Chandra Saxena, 2001–2003
- Srinivas Kumar Sinha, 2003–2008
- Narinder Nath Vohra, 2008–2018
- Satya Pal Malik, 2018–2019
- G. C. Murmu, 2019–2020
- Manoj Sinha, 2020–Present

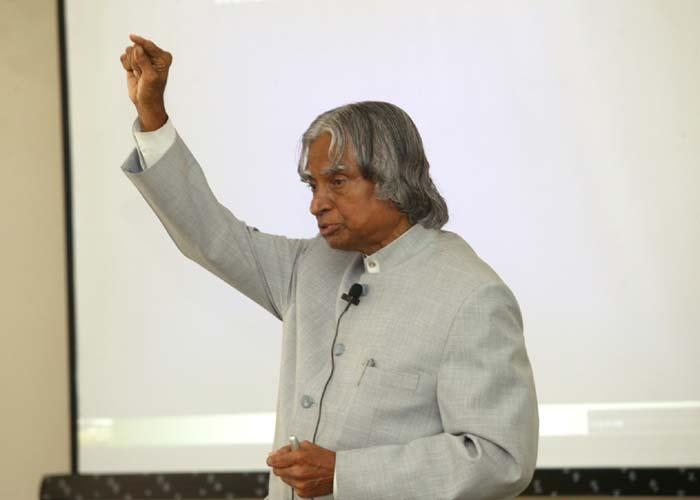
11th President of India Dr. APJ Abdul Kalam Delivering First Lecture in the SMVDU after official inauguration of the university by his hands

N. K. Bansal served as the Vice-Chancellor after the establishment of the university in 2004 and served until 2009. He started various programs in the disciplines of science, management, renewable energy and humanities and social science.

Vice-Chancellors
- Bharat B. Chattoo, 2001–2004
- N. K. Bansal, 2004–2009
- Rameshwar Nath Koul Bamezai, 2010–2013
- Sudhir Kumar Jain, 2013–2016
- Sanjeev Jain, 2016–2019
- Ravindra Kumar Sinha (biologist), 2019–2023
- Pragati Kumar 2023–Present

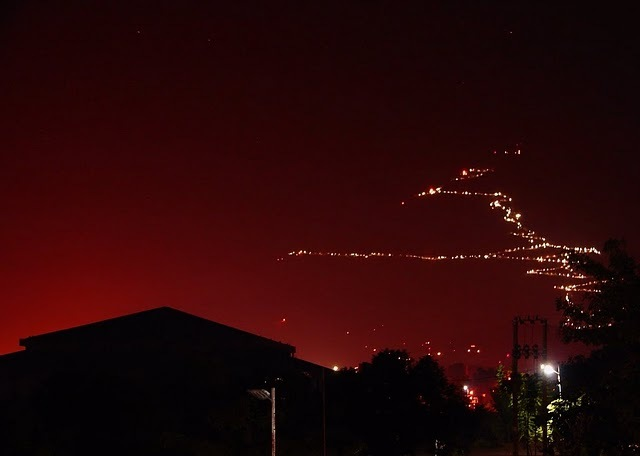
View of Mata Vaishno Devi from SMVDU campus at night

Site Plan of the university

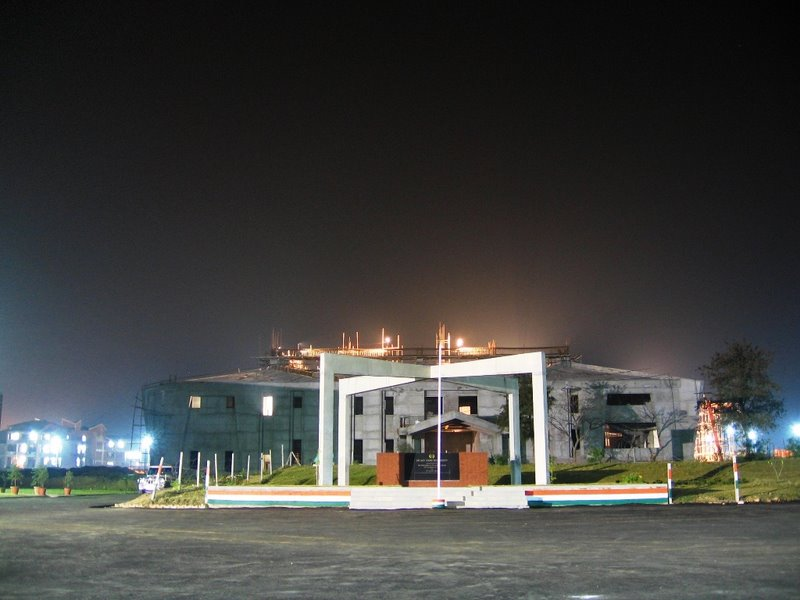
Matrika Auditorium

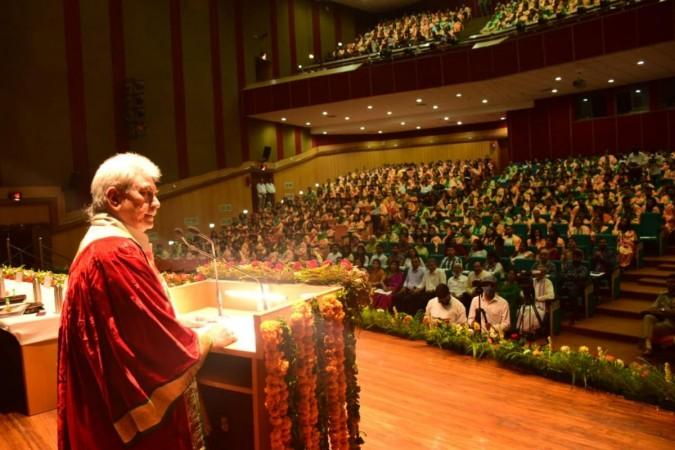
The Chancellor of SMVDU and Lieutenant Governor, Jammu & Kashmir Shri Manoj Sinha addressing at 8th Convocation of SMVDU-Katra

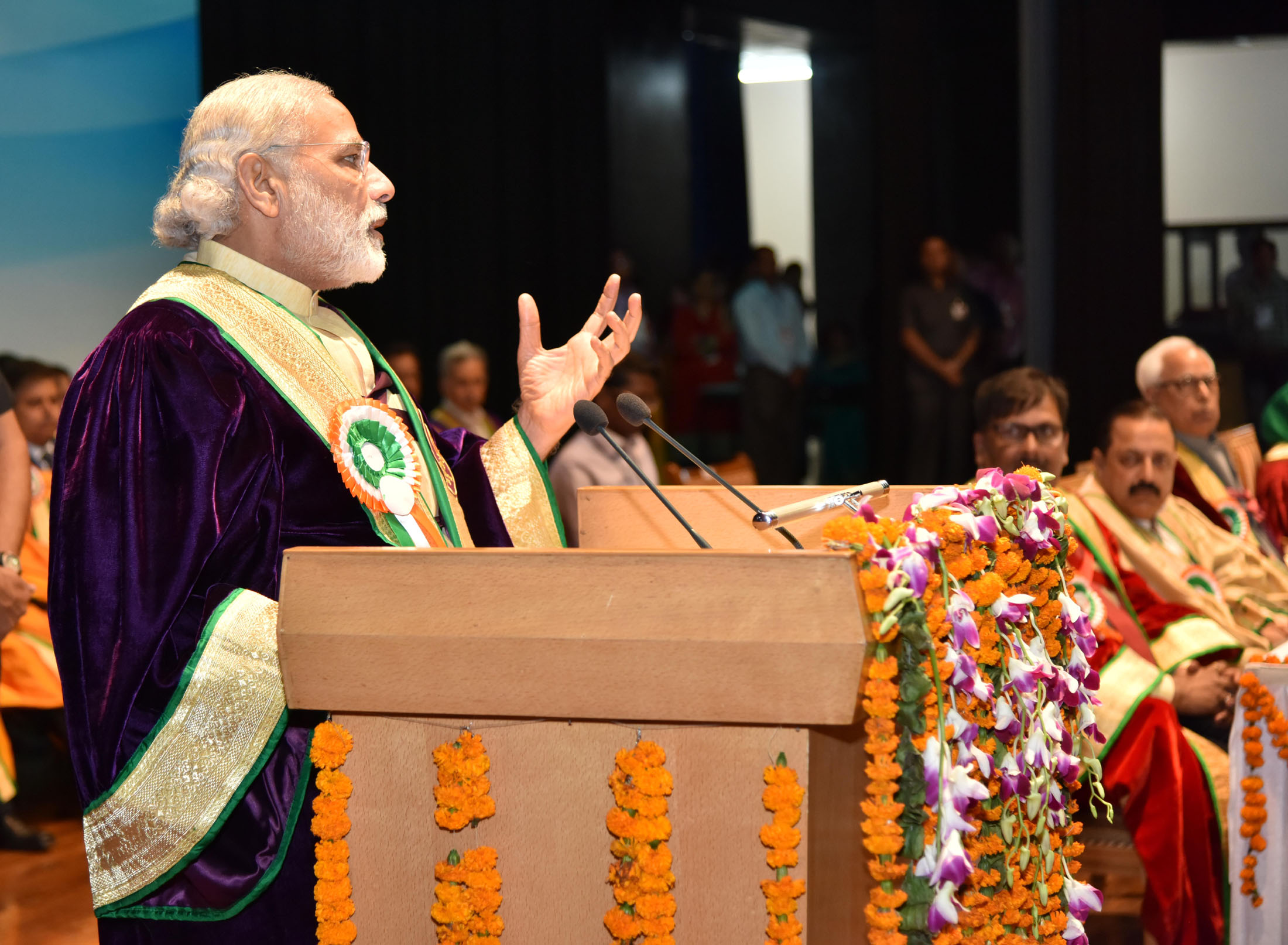
The Prime Minister, Shri Narendra Modi delivering the Convocation Address at the 5th Convocation of SMVDU-Katra

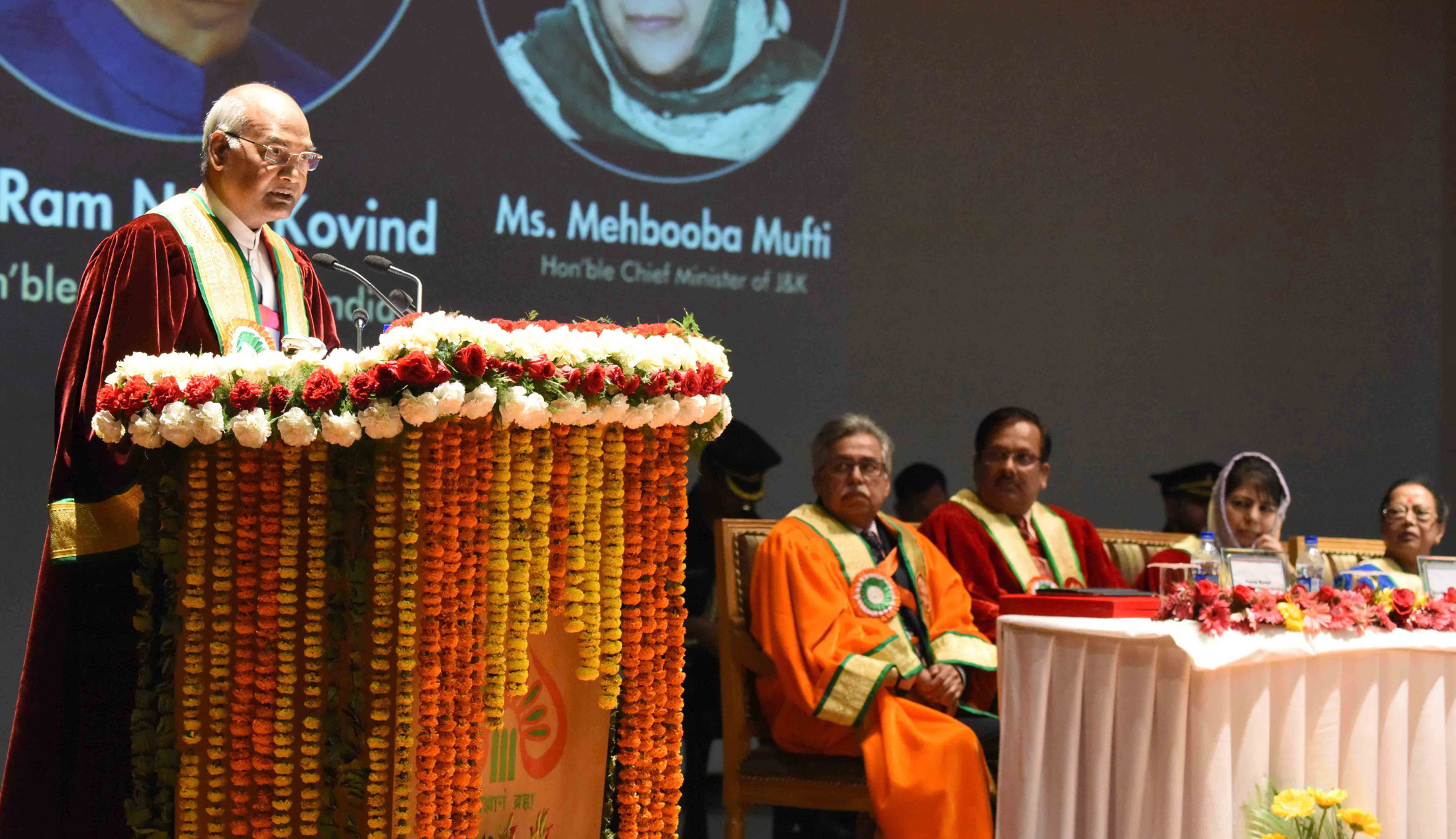
The 14th President, Shri Ram Nath Kovind addressing at the 6th Convocation of SMVDU-Katra

== Campus ==
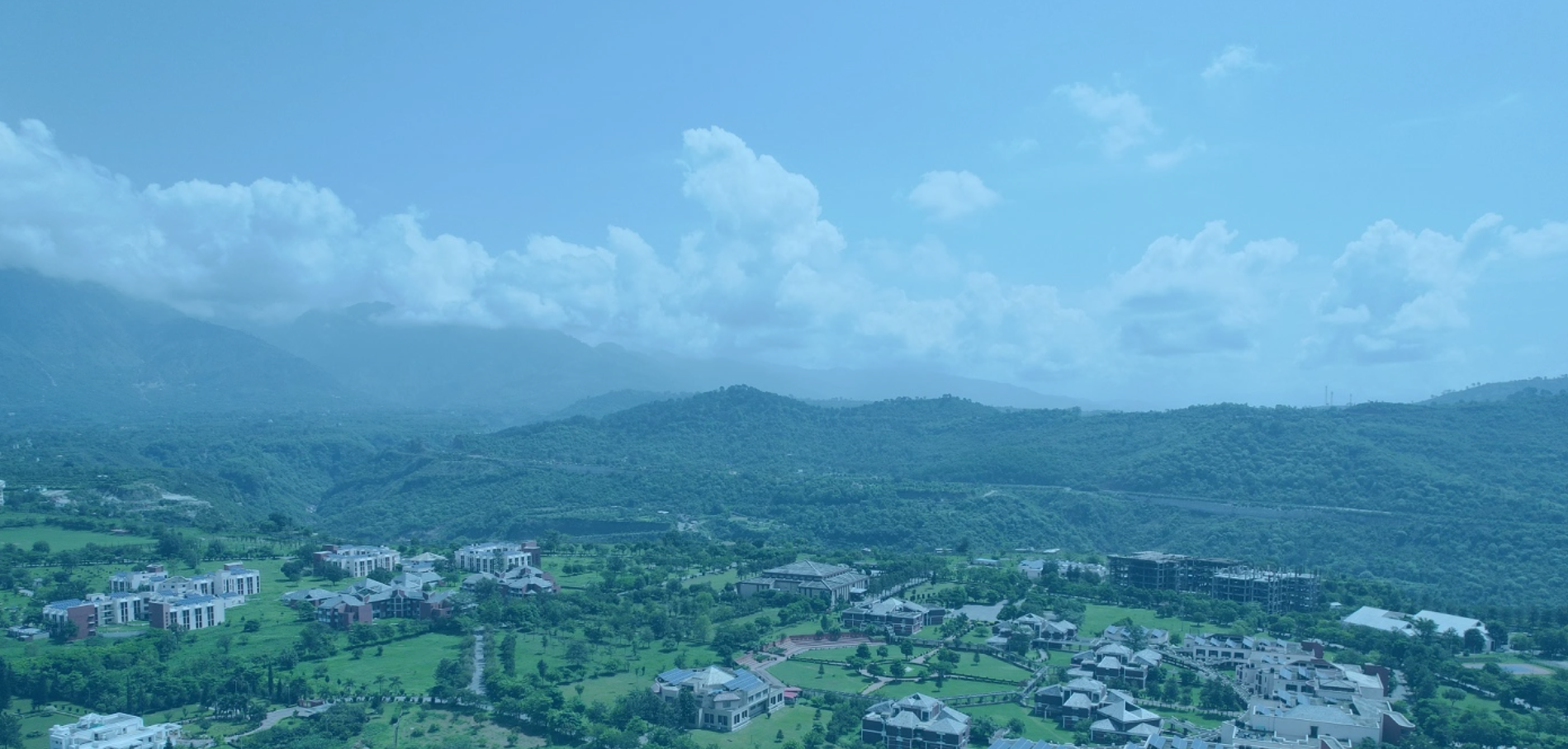
Aerial View of SMVDU

The university is in the proximity of the Trikuta foothills. The 470-acre (1.9 km^{2}) university campus is divided into five zones — administrative zone, academic zone, residential zone for faculty, staff, girls and guests, residential zone for boys, and recreation zone. The various schools of study consist of well equipped, lecture and seminar halls, conference rooms, departmental lab and computer lab and all modern facilities. This university has one of the largest campuses in India.

The initial campus plan was designed by S.Ghosh & Associates. They won the project through a national competition. The basic plan was implemented and completed by 2006.

== Organization and administration ==
=== Funding ===
The university receives funding from Shri Mata Vaishno Devi Shrine Board, an autonomous board set up in August 1986 under the provisions of The Jammu and Kashmir Shri Mata Vaishno Devi Shrine Act, 1986 of J&K State Legislature. The university also gets funds from Government of India, Govt. of Jammu and Kashmir, UGC (University Grants Commission).

=== Governance ===
The Lieutenant Governor of Jammu and Kashmir is the Chancellor of the university and the Chairman of the Shri Mata Vaishno Devi Shrine Board.

The Executive Council of the university, with the Vice-Chancellor as its head, is the supreme body of the university. The Academic Council is the highest academic body and makes recommendations to the Executive Council on academic matters. The university also has a Finance Committee and a Building & Works Committee. The Planning Board helps the Vice-Chancellor in foreseeing the growth of the university.

=== Faculties ===
There are four colleges or faculties, with a Dean heading each one of them. Each college consists of Schools of Study, analogous to departments in a university, headed by a Director. Academic de-centralization allows each school to function in an autonomous manner. The Schools offer various programs of study at undergraduate, post-graduate and doctorate levels. The university has adopted an IIT/UGC pattern of study with choice-based credit system and continuous evaluation based on Grade Point Average (GPA) on a 10-point scale.

==== Faculty of Engineering ====
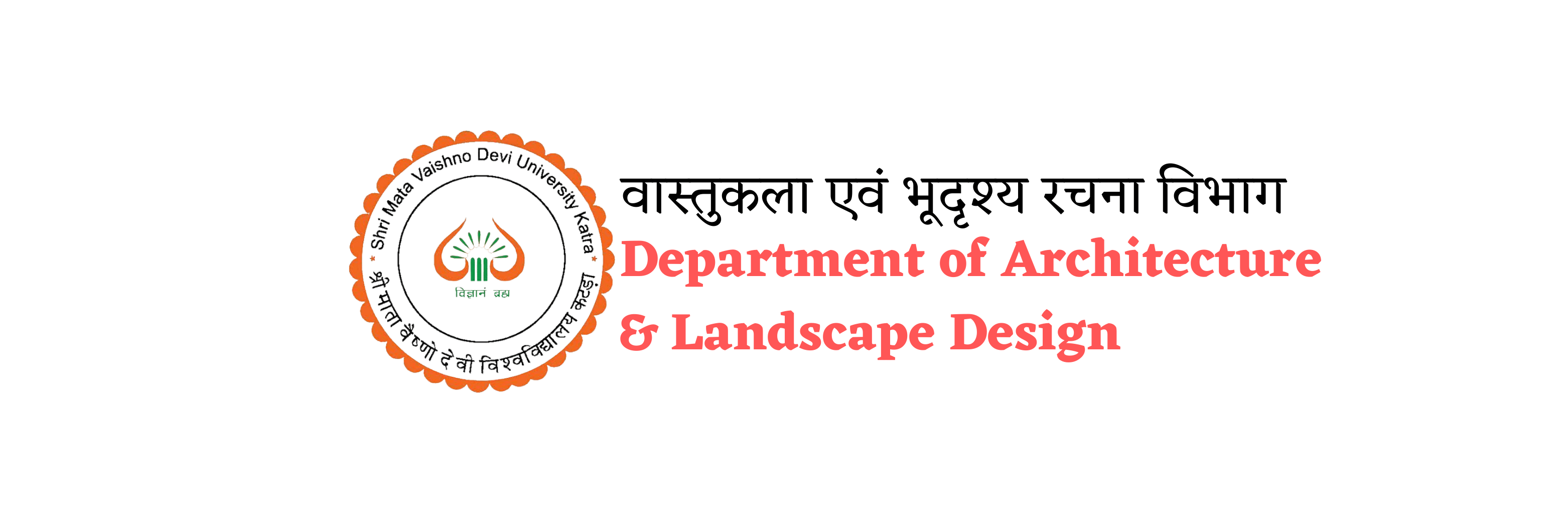
Department of Architecture and Landscape Design

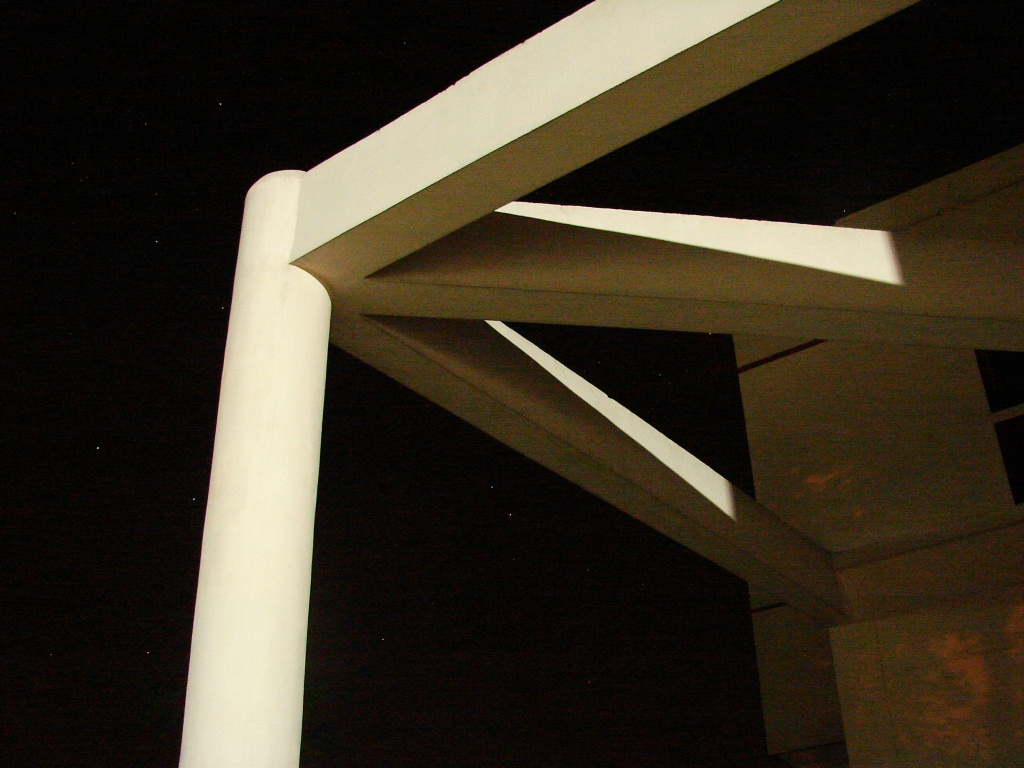
Column outside the School of Architecture & Landscape Design

- Department of Architecture and Landscape Design (formerly School of Architecture and Landscape Design): it is located in Kakryal Village near Katra town of Jammu and Kashmir. It is among 4 (four) Architectural colleges in Jammu and Kashmir, it is one of the most important institutions in the India ranked 31 by NIRF in India under Architecture Category in 2024. The School of Architecture was started in the year 2006. Dr. C.L. Razdan was the founding director of the department. It currently offers a five year Bachelor of Architecture course. The department has students from all over India.
- School of Computer Science Engineering
- School of Mechanical Engineering
- School of Electronics and Communication Engineering
- School of Electrical Engineering
- School of Civil Engineering
- School of Energy Management

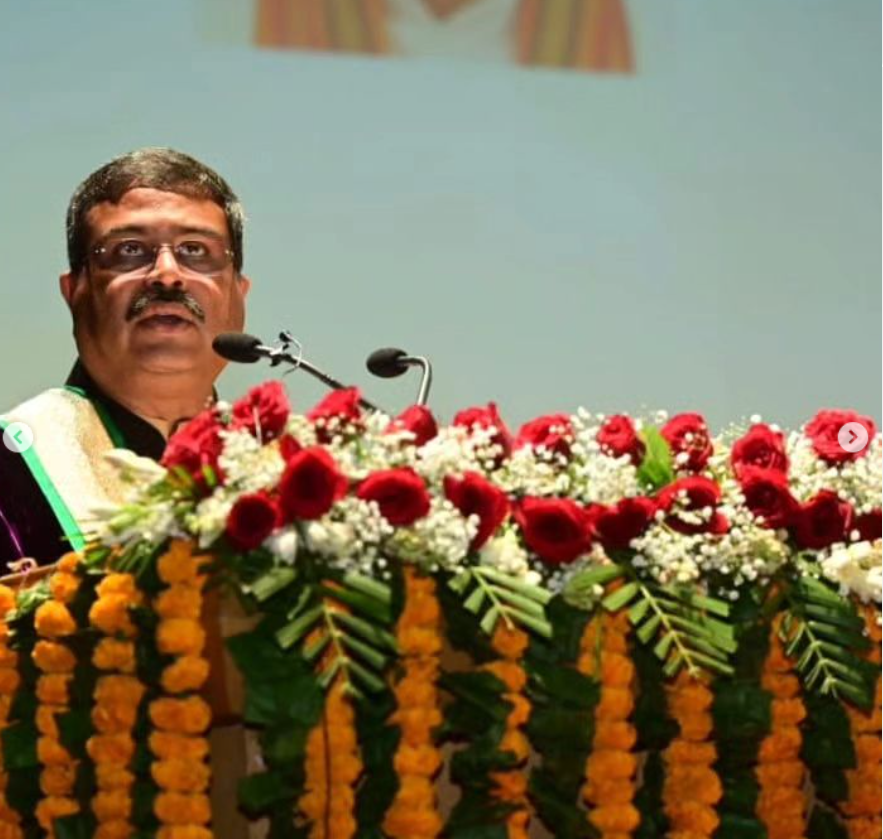
The Minister of Education, Government of India Shri Dharmendra Pradhan addressing at 9th Convocation of SMVDU-Katra

==== Faculty of Management ====
The College of Management consists of the following schools:

- School of Business
- School of Economics

==== Faculty of Sciences ====
The College of Sciences consists of the following schools:

- School of Mathematics
- School of Physics
- School of Biotechnology

==== Faculty of Humanities & Social Science ====
Source: The Faculty of Humanities & Social Sciences consists of the following Departments:

- Department of Philosophy & Culture
- Department of Languages & Literature

== Academics ==
=== Recognition ===
The university is approved by UGC under Section 2(F) & Section 12(B) of UGC Act of 1956.

The technical programs of the university are recognised by All India Council for Technical Education, while the architecture program is recognised by Council of Architecture.

University Grants Commission recognises it under section 2(f). The first convocation was held in 2008, and delivered by Prime Minister Manmohan Singh. In 2009, UGC granted 12(b) status to the university and began issuing grants to it. University is also accredited by NAAC.

=== Admissions ===
Many students are admitted into the BTech/BArch programme every year from among the high rankers of JEE (Main) through the Central Seat Allocation Board (MHRD), admission from CUET is also considered. Candidates admitted to the M.B.A. programme pass through a three tier selection process based on CAT/MAT Score, group discussions and interviews conducted by panel of academics from IITs & corporate professionals. Admissions to other post-graduate programmes (MSc, Five Years Integrated MSc Economics, MTech, MCA, M. A.) are made through national entrance tests and interviews.

=== Academic programmes ===
The university follows a credit-based programme structure, which requires students to earn a sufficient number of credits in order to earn a degree. Industrial/Corporate Training is also a mandatory part of the curriculum. Students are encouraged to work on industry sponsored projects. A continuous evaluation system is followed, and evaluation techniques such as quizzes, assignments, and minor and major tests are used periodically. Each school has a Board of Studies consisting of eminent academics and professionals from industry who update the syllabi to ensure relevance of the content vis-à-vis the needs of industry as well as research.

Extensive usage of varied contemporary pedagogy, such as multi-media teaching aids like digital projectors, OHP, net-enabled labs, video conferencing, cut-section models, and simulation software, are used to enrich the teaching–learning process. Field visits are conducted regularly to familiarise students with real world applications of the knowledge learnt.

Visiting lectures by a variety of faculty members and professionals are arranged on a regular basis to broaden the scope of learning. The university has a high student teacher ratio of 12:1.

=== Rankings ===
University and college rankings

General – India
- NIRF (Universities) (2023): 151-200

Engineering – India
- NIRF (2024): 151-200

Architecture – India
- NIRF (2023): 26
- NIRF (2024): 31

The College of Engineering was ranked in the 151-200 category by the National Institutional Ranking Framework (NIRF) in 2025. The School of Architecture was ranked in 23 by the NIRF university ranking in 2025.

=== Student Assistantship Program ===
The top ten per cent of students in each class are awarded scholarships, with tuition fee waivers ranging from 100% to 50% (subject to fulfilment of merit restrictions).

=== Outreach ===
The university has entered into collaboration with high-profile institutions in India and abroad, including IIT Delhi, Punjab University, Baba Saheb Bhimrao Ambedkar University, Lucknow IIM, Kurukshetra University, Thapar University, Aachen University and Kun-Shan University. The university has recently started hosting the British Council Higher Education Center for convenience of students. The university is among the few institutions in the country which host the Counseling Center of AIEEE-CCB.

== Research ==
=== Labs and Library ===
The university has over 35 laboratories. In addition to the University Central Library which is known as Prof. N.K. Bansal Memorial Library, which contains more than 50,000 books, each school has its own reference library. A virtual digital library facility is also available and it is opening for all students. The university has further access to academic journals through the AICTE-INDEST consortium.

=== Research Centres ===
UGC has funded the following research centres established by the university to pursue active research resulting in patents, products and publications:

- Center for Embedded Instrumentation & Networked Controls
- Center of Excellence in Biotechnology
- Center for Advanced Manufacturing
- Center for Energy Management & Water Resource
- Center of Excellence for Entrepreneurial Development

== Student life ==
=== Student hostels ===
The university has a residential system which can accommodate all the students on campus in six hostels (Vidhyanchal, Nilgiri, Trikuta, Kailash, Old & New Basohli for Boys, and Old & New Shivalik and Vaishnavi for Girls).

=== College festivals ===
Following are the major festivals in the annual calendar:

- Ekatava, annual technical fest of all the departments combined
- Titiksha, the annual national level technical festival
- Tatva, a management festival
- Srijan, an architecture festival
- Resurgence, an annual cultural festival
- Sarang, a sports festival
- Lit-Life, an annual literature festival held by the Department of Languages and Literature
- Artha, an economics festival

International conferences, Annual Science Day, Annual Engineers Day, monthly "Mind-meet" panel discussions, and open source technology meetups are held regularly.

In March 2010, the university hosted the Zonal NASA Convention with 750 students of architecture from North Indian architecture institutions.

== See also ==
- School of Architecture & Landscape Design, Shri Mata Vaishno Devi University
