= Vijay Shankar Vyas =

Indian economist

Vijay Shankar Vyas (21 August 1931 – 12 September 2018) was a noted agricultural economist of India. He hailed from Pushkarna Brahmin community in Bikaner and authored six books. Vyas died on 12 September 2018.

== Career ==
Vyas was the Director of IIM, Ahmedabad; IDS, Jaipur and Senior Advisor, Agriculture and Rural Development Department, the world Bank. Professor Vyas was Emeritus Professor at the Institute of Development Studies, Jaipur. He was a member of the Central Board of Directors of the Reserve Bank of India. Prof. V.S. Vyas was founder Director of Agro-Economic Research Centre (AERC) of Ministry of Agriculture and Farmers Welfare, GOI at Sardar Patel University, Vallabh Vidyanagar, Anand, Gujarat, India. Dr. V. S. Vyas has established rich traditions of research in agricultural economics at AERC, SPU, VVN, GUJARAT.

== Education ==
Vyas authored / co-authored six books and published numerous articles in notable national and international journals. He was invited to deliver lectures and keynotes in many workshops and seminars in India and abroad. The contribution made him an honorary life member of the International Association of Agricultural Economists. He was elected as a Fellow of the National Academy of Agricultural Sciences.

== Awards ==
Vyas received the Padma Bhushan award in 2006 from the Government of India. He was honoured at the award ceremony by the President of India on Republic Day. Vyas served as Chairman and Member of Boards, at International, National and State Level.
