= M.B.M. University =

Engineering college in Rajasthan, India

- Former name: MBM Engineering College
- Motto: Faith and Labour
- Type: Public University
- Established: 1951; 75 years ago
- Chancellor: Governor of Rajasthan
- Vice-Chancellor: Ajay Kumar Sharma
- Students: 3000+
- Undergraduates: 2300+
- Location: Jodhpur, Rajasthan, India
- Campus: Urban, 98 acres (396,591.9 m^{2})
- Website: mbm.ac.in

M.B.M. University (Mugneeram Bangur Memorial University) is a state university in Jodhpur, Rajasthan, India. In September 2021, M.B.M. Engineering College, was upgraded to a full public state university, which is now popularly known as M.B.M. University.

== History ==
The M.B.M. Engineering College (currently, M.B.M. University) was established on 15 August 1951, by the Government of Rajasthan. This was made possible by a donation of INR 8,00000 (8 Lacs) from Seth Ramcooverji Bangur of Didwana and INR 2,00000 (2 Lacs) from the Hanwant Benevolent Fund. Mathuradas Mathur and A. D. Bohra started the college in the Ugamji's bungalow near the railway over bridge leading to Sojati Gate, within two months of obtaining approval from the Government. The laboratories and hostels were housed in the old guest house in Ratanada. After a couple of years, the college moved to its present location covering an area of 92,000 sq.m. and new hostels were constructed. With the establishment of Jodhpur University (Now, Jai Narain Vyas University) in July 1962, the M.B.M. Engineering College remained its constitutive Faculty of Engineering from 1962 to 2021.

V. G. Garde became Principal on 3 December 1951. Professors who later joined the college include Hari Singh Choudhary, S.C. Goyal, R.M. Advani, M. L. Mathur, Alam Singh, S. Divakaran, V. S. Bansal, D. C. Surana, and BC Punamia.

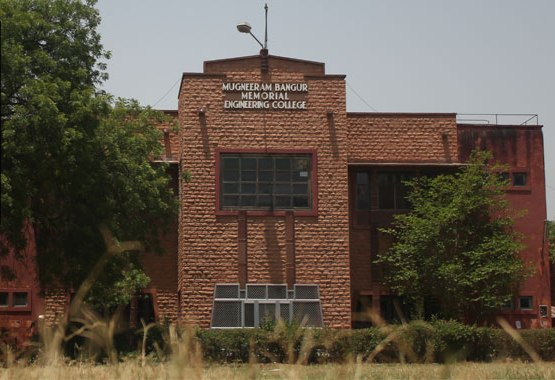
Administrative Block of M.B.M. Engineering College

=== Academic history ===
MBM offers courses of study in engineering and educational programmes leading to the degrees of Bachelor of Engineering, Master of Engineering, Doctor of Philosophy (PhD), and postgraduate diploma in the following:

- In 1951, MBM started, offering a three-year degree course leading to bachelor's degree in civil engineering, and a two-year diploma course in civil engineering, with an intake of 35 students in each course.
- In 1957, a bachelor's degree in mining engineering was started.
- In 1958, bachelor’s degree courses in electrical engineering and mechanical engineering were started.
- In 1966, master's degree in civil, electrical, mechanical and mining engineering were started.
- In 1972, a bachelor's degree in electronics and communication engineering was first offered.
- In 1988, a master's degree course in Master in Computer Application was started.
- In 1990, a master's degree in electronics and communication engineering and bachelor's degree in computer science and engineering and production and industrial engineering were started.
- In 1998, a degree course in chemical engineering and a Bachelor of Architecture were started.
- In 1999, a postgraduate diploma in stone technology was started.
- In 2000, the department of computer science and engineering started a degree course in information technology.
- In 2010 a postgraduate diploma in interior design was started in Department of Architecture, with the intake of 60 students.
- In 2011 the department of electronics & communication added undergraduate B.E. programs in electronics and electrical engineering, and electronics and computer engineering. A degree course named "Bachelor of Building and Construction Technology" was started with the intake of 60 students with the approval of AICTE.
- In 2012 the Bachelor of Architecture course was restarted with the permission of Council of Architecture, with an intake of 40 students.
- In 2021 it became a government-owned autonomous public university in the Rajasthan state of India.

=== Visitors ===
Presidents of India Rajendra Prasad and Sarvepalli Radhakrishnan, Home Minister Govind Ballabh Pant, Finance Minister Man Mohan Singh, Minister of Railways Ashwini Vaishnaw were among visitors to the college.

== Educational Multimedia Research Center ==
Educational Multimedia Research Center (EMMRC), Jodhpur a production and research center for educational films for UGC-CWCR, received national recognition for its contribution in the field of electronic media. The Center is fully funded by the University Grants Commission.

The AVRC project (Now Educational Multimedia Research Center) was sanctioned by the UGC in 1986, and produces educational TV films. The UGC upgraded the Center from AVRC to EMRC (Educational Media Research Center) in 1991, which became EM2RC (Educational Multimedia Research Center) in September 2004. After producing its first film, "Desert Bats", in 1987, the EMMRC produced over 1,900 educational TV films in Hindi and English on subjects including science, commerce, arts, education, literature, culture, folklore, humanity, medical science, engineering, etc. Twenty of them won appreciation and awards at the national level; they include

- Jeevat Ke Dhani: Hanuman Langoor
- Gangaur - Ek Sanskritik Virasat - 1
- Maand: Parampara Ki Pratishruti - 1 & 2
- Worlds Oldest Mountain Chain Aravalli
- Jodhpur Durg - Mehrangarh
- Neem - The Green Goldmine

=== Departments, centres, and schools ===
The academic departments in MBM University include the following:

- Chemical Engineering
- Chemistry
- Civil Engineering
- Computer Science & Engineering
- Electrical Engineering
- Humanities & Social Science
- Production & Industrial Engineering
- Mathematics
- Mechanical Engineering
- Physics
- mining engineering
- electronics and communication engineering
- Petroleum engineering
- structural engineering

== Alumni association ==
"MBM Engineering College Alumni Association" was founded at the time of Silver Jubilee celebration of the college in 1976 by professors Alam Singh, GK Agarwal, ML Mathur, S. Divakaran, BC Punmia and D V Talwar. The association's stated objectives include organising activities in the college, and awarding scholarships and prizes to students.

== Notable alumni ==
- Ashwini Vaishnaw, Minister of Railways, Government of India
- Vasudev Devnani, Speaker of the Rajasthan Legislative Assembly, MLA from Ajmer North
- Prem Shanker Goel, Indian Space Scientist
- Vishal Garg, professor at Plaksha University
- Ladu Ram, former member of the Rajasthan Legislative Assembly
- Sona Ram, former Member of Parliament
- Bhupender Singh, recipient of Shaurya Chakra

== See also ==
- List of universities and higher education colleges in Jodhpur
