= Jodhpur National University =

Private university in Jodhpur, India

Coordinates: 26.177°N 72.913°E

- Crest of the JNU
- Type: Private State University
- Established: 2008
- Affiliations: UGC, AIU, AICTE, BCI, DCI
- Chairperson: CA Kamal Mehta
- President: D. K. Mehta
- Administrator: Divisional Commissioner Jodhpur (IAS)
- Location: Jodhpur, Rajasthan, India
- Campus: Suburban
- Colours
- Nickname: JNU
- Website: Jodhpur National University Website

Jodhpur National University (JNU) is a private university situated in the outskirts of Jodhpur. Covering a 30-acre campus, the university was established in 2008 as a state private university under Section 2(f) of the UGC Act, 1956. Jodhpur National University offers a range of academic programs in arts, law, engineering, and sciences. In 2014 there were more than 13,000 students.

== Academics ==
Courses available with Jodhpur National University:

Faculty	Course	Institutes
Engineering and Technology	Diploma, B.Tech, M.Tech & Ph.D	Jodhpur Engineering College & Research Centre
Medicine and Health	BDS, MDS, MPH, MHA, MPT, BPT & DMLT	Jodhpur Dental College General Hospital & Jodhpur School of Public & PhD.
Applied Sciences	B., B.Sc.(PCM, PCB) (Biotech & CBZ), B.Sc. MLT & B.Sc, Ph.D	University Campus
Computer Application	DCA, BCA, MCA & PGDCA	University Campus
Law	B.A., LL.B., LLM	University Campus
Management	B.Com(Hon.), BBA & MBA, Ph.D	University Camus / JIM
Arts and Commerce	B.A, B.Com, B.Lib, BJMC, M.A, M.Com, M.Lib & MJMC	University Campus
Education	B.Ed	Marwar B.Ed. College
