= Exodia =

Festival in Himachal Pradesh

- Logo of Exodia
- Genre: techno-cultural festival
- Locations: Mandi, India
- Founded: 2012
- Guests: Richard Stallman, Vic Hayes, Mark Tully
- Major events: Technical, Cultural, Literary, Informal and Online events
- Filing status: Student Run, Non-Profit Organization
- Sponsor: Indian Institute of Technology Mandi
- Website: exodia-iitmandi.org

Exodia is the annual techno-cultural fest of Indian Institute of Technology Mandi. It is a three-day-long event held every year. The first edition was held in 2012 and since then it has grown to be one of the largest student-run college fests of the Himalayas. It is one of the biggest events of the Himalayan region and attracts crowds from throughout northern India. The fest also tries to promote the Himalayan region and showcase its culture and beauty by orchestrating some of its events for the same.

== Inception ==
IIT Mandi is the newest of the new IITs. The year 2011, fueled by the immense desire of the students saw major growth in the cultural activities of the Institute, which ultimately culminated in Exodia 2012, the first major event as well as the first techno-cult fest of the Institute. For its first two years, the fest was organized on the transit Campus. The year 2014 saw for the first time, the fest moving to the permanent campus at Kamand, Mandi. This provides an opportunity for scaling the fest, as well as for proper exposure to the scenic beauty that exists in the Himalayas.

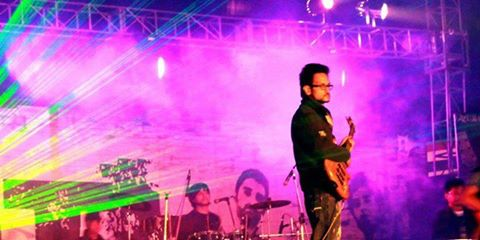
Synchronians in Exodia 2012

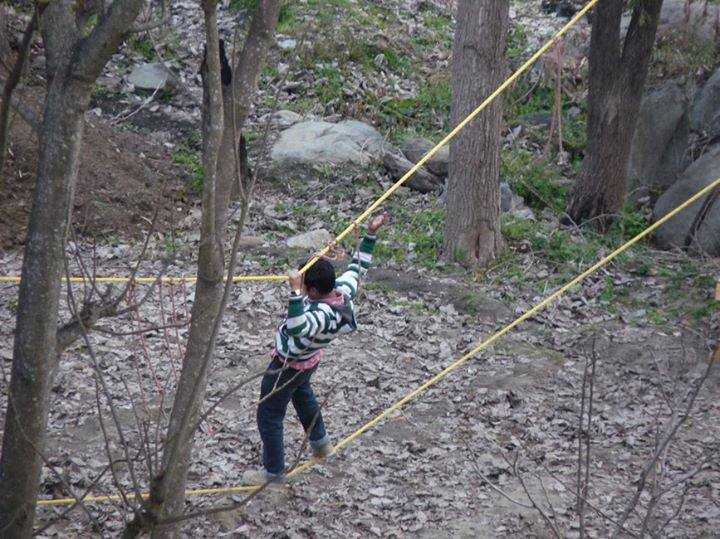
An Adventure Event in Exodia

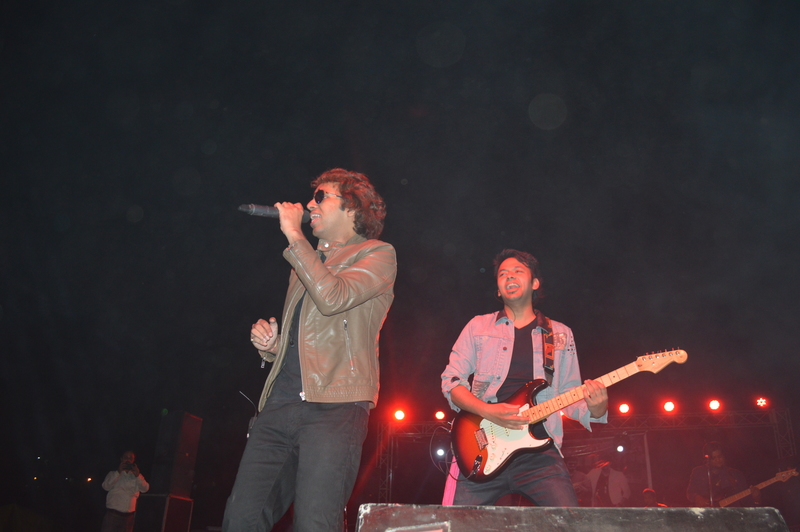
Pronite@Exodia 2016

== Events ==
As a college fest, the main participants of Exodia are the youth, and so the event is primarily centered on them. The fest encompasses a variety of events, ranging from literary, cultural, and technical, to online and informal events. There is I-Magination, the online photography contest as well as the Meme Challenge. There is a plethora of events catering to the dance fanatics, the singers and youths who love to groove to the music, like Bandslam, Synchronians, Groove Fanatics, and also, the Exodia Idol. The event does not hold back when it comes to literary events, offering a "No holds barred" heated debate in the form of "The Devil's Advocate", extempore based "React and Act" and an all-time classic "The Biggest Liar". Being primarily a technology college, it also offers a platform for the tech enthusiasts to showcase their skills in programming, research, and robotics.

== Notable personalities ==
Exodia has witnessed many influential personalities since its inception. Richard Stallman, founder of the Free Software Foundation, was present at the first edition of Exodia, and left a lasting impression. The event has also seen Vic Hayes, known as the father of the WiFi, and Mark Tully. The last held edition of the fest, in 2018 witnessed the performance of Progressive Brothers as one of the Pro-nite headlines.
