= Indian Institutes of Technology =

Public technical universities in India

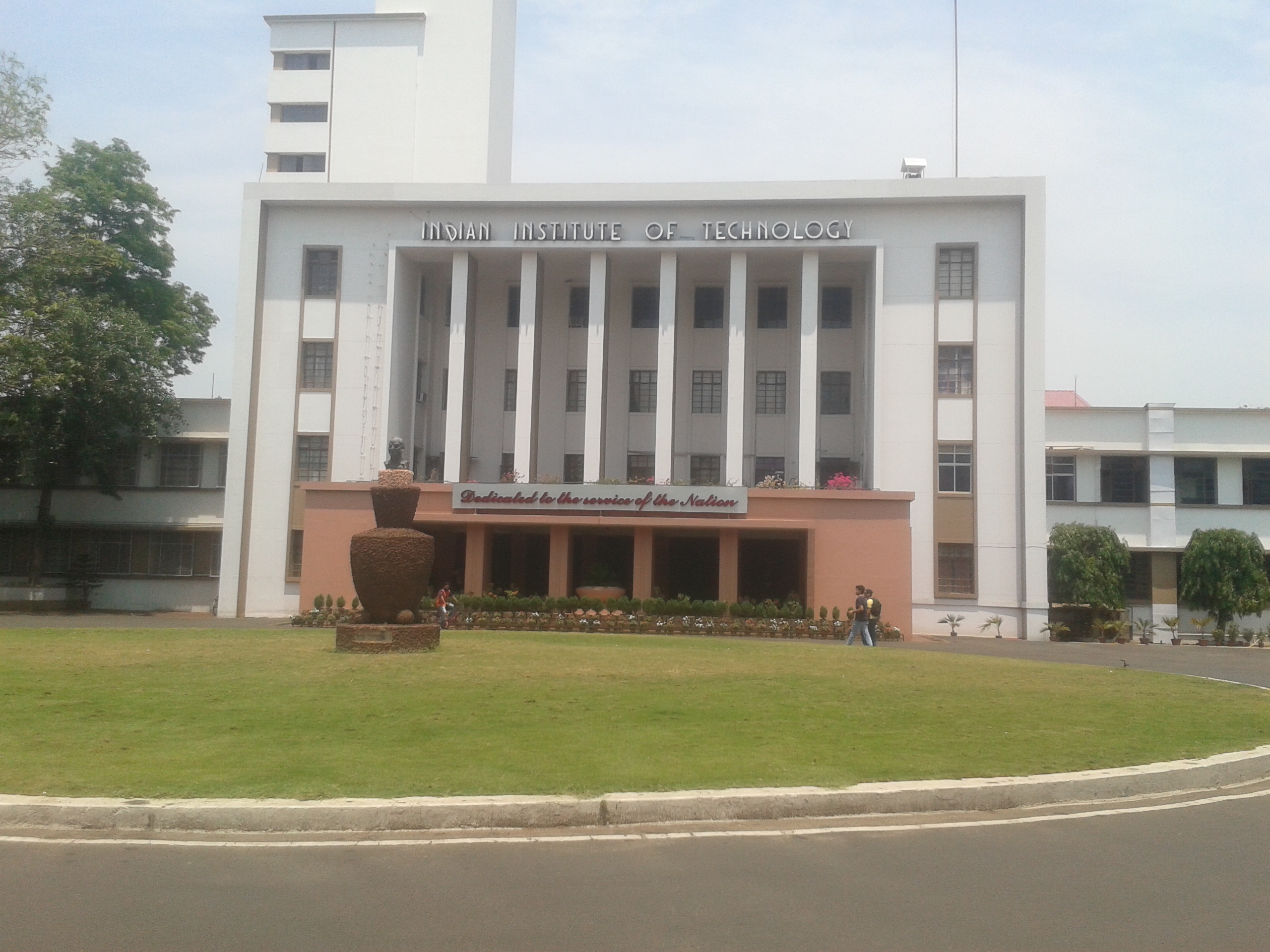
- Main building of IIT Kharagpur, first of all 23 IITs
- Other name: IIT or IITs (plural)
- Type: Public technical institute
- Established: 15 May 1950 (76 years ago)
- Parent institution: Ministry of Education, Government of India
- Budget: ₹11,349 crore (US$1.2 billion) (FY2024–25 est.)
- Visitor: President of India
- Location: 23 cities in India (2 more campuses overseas, in UAE & Tanzania)
- Language: English
- Website: iitsystem.ac.in

The Indian Institutes of Technology (IITs) are a network of autonomous public engineering, technology and research universities in India. Established in 1950, they are under the purview of the Ministry of Education of the Government of India and are governed by the Institutes of Technology Act, 1961.

The Act designates them as Institutes of National Importance and lays down their powers, duties, and governance framework as the country's premier institutions in the field of technology. There are currently 23 IITs functioning under this act. Each IIT operates autonomously and is linked to the others through a common council called the IIT Council, which oversees their administration. The Minister of Education serves as the ex officio chairperson of the IIT Council.

Location of the 23 IITs

== History ==
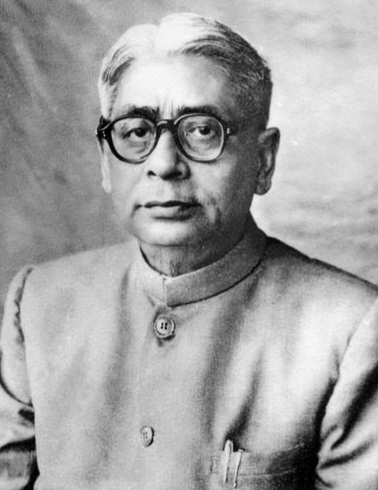
Nalini Ranjan Sarkar, who recommended the set up of Indian Institutes of Technology (IITs), along the lines of Massachusetts Institute of Technology

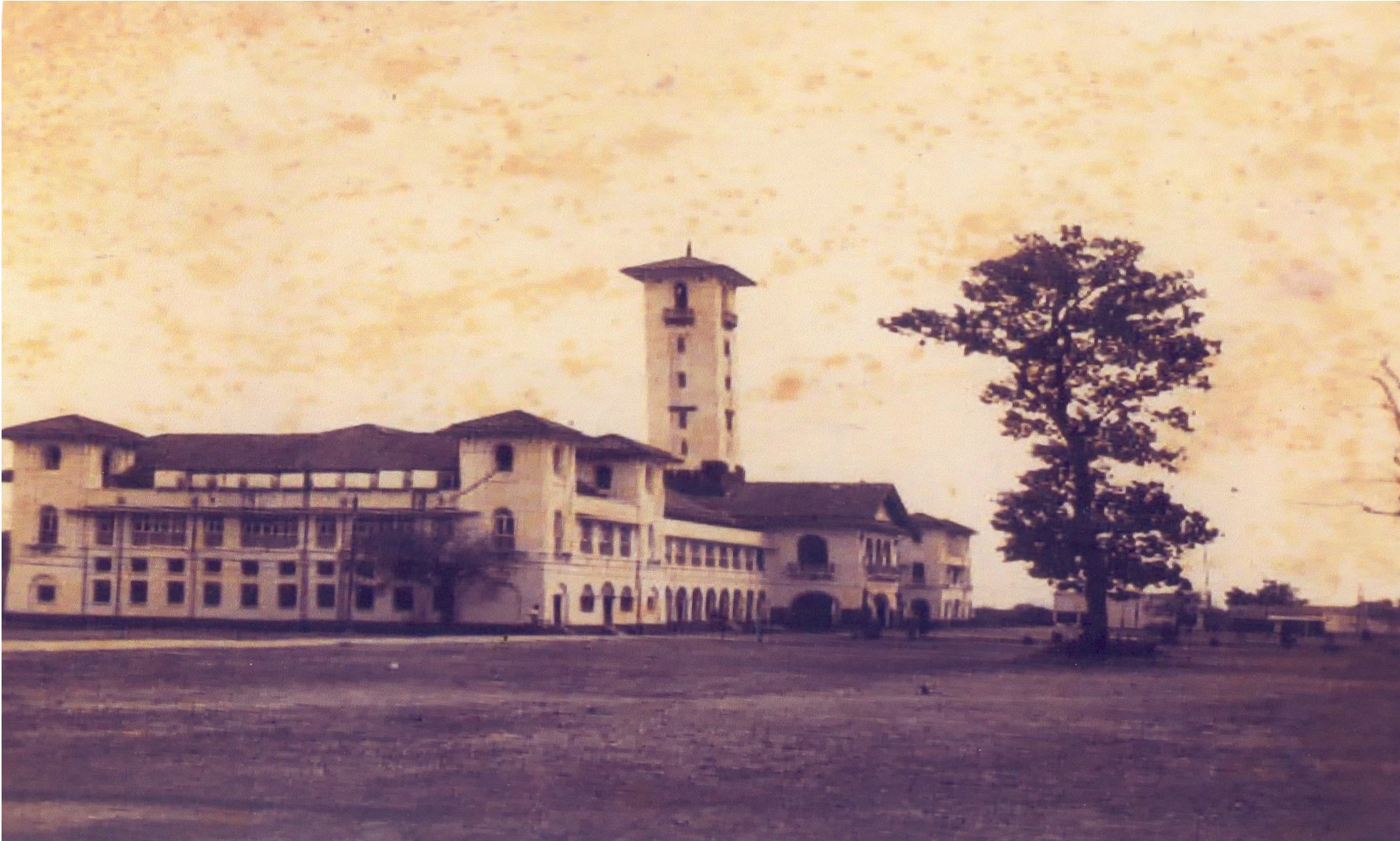
The office of the Hijli Detention Camp served as the first academic building of IIT Kharagpur.

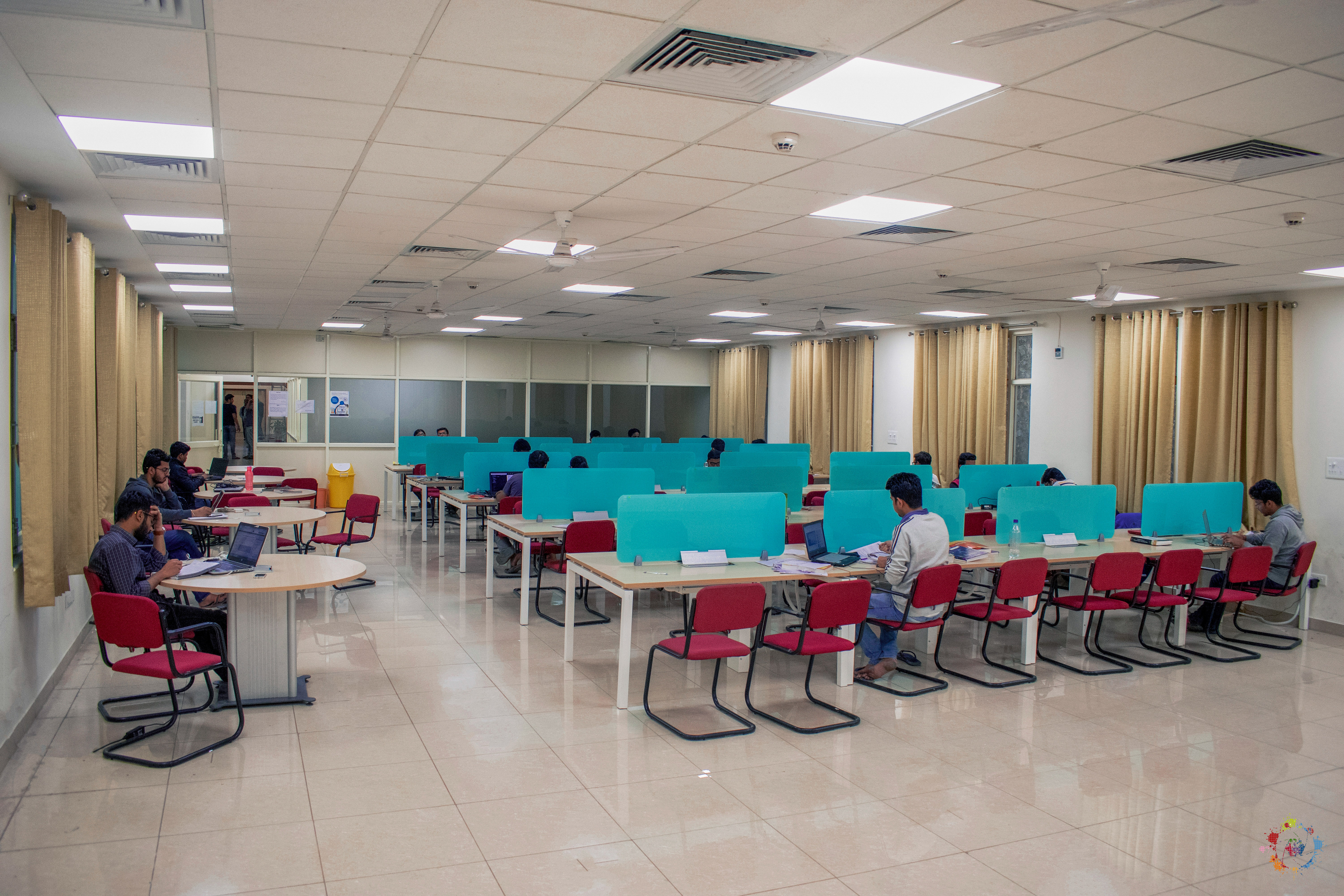
Library at IIT BHU

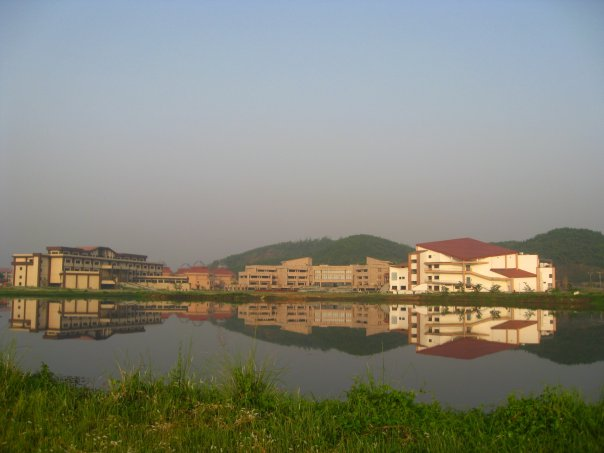
IIT Guwahati, established in 1994

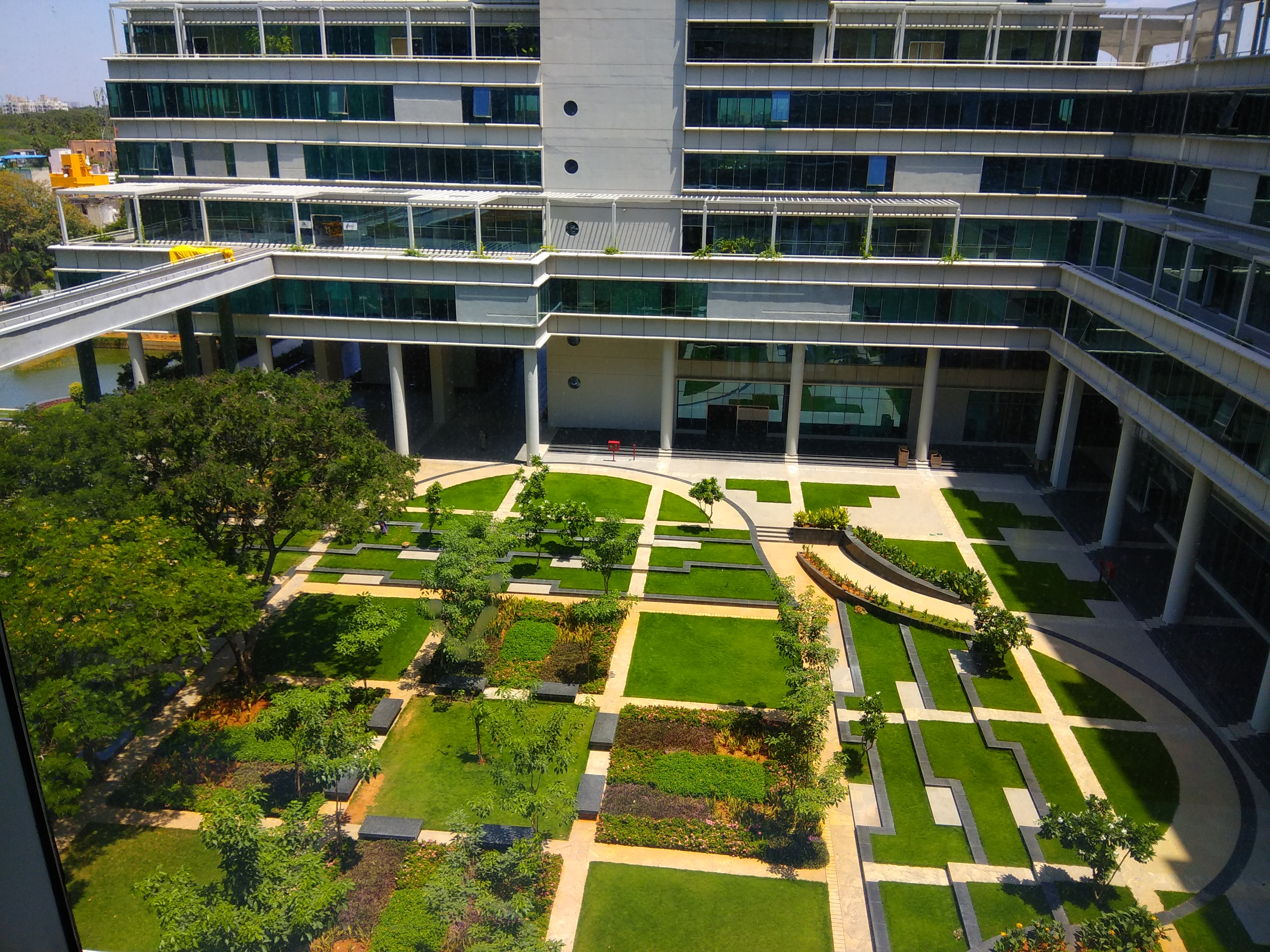
IIT Madras Research Park at Chennai

In the late 1940s, a 22-member committee, headed by Nalini Ranjan Sarkar, recommended the establishment of these institutions in various parts of India, along the lines of the Massachusetts Institute of Technology (MIT), with affiliated secondary institutions.

The first Indian Institute of Technology was founded in May 1950 at the site of the Hijli Detention Camp in Kharagpur, West Bengal. The name "Indian Institute of Technology" was adopted before the formal inauguration of the institute on 18 August 1951 by Maulana Abul Kalam Azad.

On 15 September 1956, the Parliament of India passed the Indian Institute of Technology (Kharagpur) Act, declaring it as an Institute of National Importance. Jawaharlal Nehru, first Prime Minister of India, in the first convocation address of IIT Kharagpur in 1956, said:

Here in the place of that Hijli Detention Camp stands the fine monument of India, representing India's urges, India's future in the making. This picture seems to me symbolically of the changes coming to India.

On the recommendations of the Sarkar Committee, four campuses were established at Bombay (1958), Madras (1959), Kanpur (1959), and Delhi (1961). The locations of these campuses were chosen to be scattered throughout India to prevent regional imbalance. The Indian Institutes of Technology Act was amended to reflect the addition of new IITs.

In the tenth meeting of IIT Council in 1972, it was also proposed to convert the then IT-BHU into an IIT and a committee was appointed by IIT Council for the purpose but because of political reasons, the desired conversion could not be achieved then. IT-BHU had been taking admissions through Indian Institute of Technology Joint Entrance Examination (IIT-JEE) for undergraduate courses and Graduate Aptitude Test in Engineering (GATE) for postgraduate courses since 1972. Finally, in 2012 the Institute of Technology, Banaras Hindu University was made a member of the IITs and renamed as IIT (BHU) Varanasi.

Student agitations in the state of Assam made Prime Minister Rajiv Gandhi promise the creation of a new IIT in Assam. This led to the establishment of a sixth institution at Guwahati under the Assam Accord in 1994.

In 2001, the University of Roorkee was converted into IIT Roorkee. Over the next few years, there have been several developments toward establishing new IITs. On 1 October 2003, Prime Minister Atal Bihari Vajpayee announced plans to create more IITs "by upgrading existing academic institutions that have the necessary promise and potential". Subsequent developments led to the formation of the S K Joshi Committee, in November 2003, to guide the selection of the five institutions which would be converted into IITs. Based on the initial recommendations of the Sarkar Committee, it was decided that new IITs should be spread throughout the country. When the government expressed its willingness to correct this regional imbalance, 16 states demanded IITs. Since the S K Joshi Committee prescribed strict guidelines for institutions aspiring to be IITs, only seven colleges were selected for final consideration. Plans are also reported to open IITs outside India, although there has not been much progress in this regard. Eventually in the 11th Five year plan, eight states were identified for establishment of new IITs.

From 2008 to 2009, eight new IITs were set up in Gandhinagar, Jodhpur, Hyderabad, Indore, Patna, Bhubaneswar, Ropar, and Mandi.

In 2015 and 2016, six new IITs were established in Tirupati, Palakkad, Dharwad, Bhilai, Goa, and Jammu, as approved by a 2016 bill amendment, along with the conversion of Indian School of Mines Dhanbad into IIT, Dhanbad.

The entire allocation by the central government for the 2026-27 budget for all Indian Institutes of Technology (IITs) is slightly over Rs. 12123.00 Cr (about 1.343 billion US$). However, the aggregate money spent by Indian students for tertiary education in the United States was about six times more than what the central government spends on all IITs.

In June 2023, education officials of India and Tanzania announced that the first foreign IIT campus would be established on the Tanzanian autonomous territory of Zanzibar, as a satellite campus of IIT Madras. The campus is scheduled to begin offering classes in October 2023.

== Organisational structure ==
Organisational structure of IITs

The president of India is the ex officio visitor, and has residual powers. Directly under the president is the IIT Council, comprising minister-in-charge of technical education in the Union Government, the chairmen of all IITs, the directors of all IITs, the chairman of the University Grants Commission, the director general of CSIR, the chairman of IISc, the director of IISc, three members of Parliament, the Joint Council secretary of Ministry of Education, and three appointees each of the Union Government, AICTE, and the visitor.

Under the IIT Council is the board of governors of each IIT. Under the board is the director, who is the chief academic and executive officer of the IIT. Under the director, in the organisational structure, comes the deputy director. Under the director and the deputy director, come the deans, heads of departments, registrar, president of the Students' Council, and chairman of the Hall Management Committee. The registrar is the chief administrative officer of the IIT and overviews the day-to-day operations. Below the heads of department (HOD) are the faculty members (professors, associate professors, and assistant professors). The wardens come under the chairman of the Hall Management Committee.

=== The Institutes of Technology Act ===
The Institute of Technology Act (parliamentary legislation) gives legal status, including degree-granting powers, to the Indian Institutes of Technology (IITs). It was notified in the gazette as Act Number 59 of 1961 on 20 December 1961 and came into effect on 1 April 1962. The Act also declares these institutes as Institutes of National Importance.

== List of all Indian Institutes of Technology ==
IITs and their locations, sorted by date of establishment
No.	Name	Abbreviation	Founded	Converted as IIT	State/UT	Website	Faculty	Students	Budget
1	IIT Kharagpur	IITKGP	1951	1951	West Bengal	www.iitkgp.ac.in	928	15,862	₹1,302.45 crore (US$140 million)
2	IIT Bombay	IITB	1958	1958	Maharashtra	www.iitb.ac.in	759	12,976	₹896 crore (US$96 million)
3	IIT Kanpur	IITK	1959	1959	Uttar Pradesh	www.iitk.ac.in	655	8,346	₹853 crore (US$91 million)
4	IIT Madras	IITM	1959	1959	Tamil Nadu	www.iitm.ac.in	674	10,238	₹996 crore (US$110 million)
5	IIT Delhi	IITD	1961	1961	Delhi	home.iitd.ac.in	687	12,543	₹904.91 crore (US$97 million)
6	IIT Guwahati	IITG	1994	1995	Assam	www.iitg.ac.in	539	7,849	₹442.38 crore (US$47 million)
7	IIT Roorkee	IITR	1847	2002	Uttarakhand	www.iitr.ac.in	585	9,735	₹818.60 crore (US$87 million)
8	IIT Jodhpur	IITJ	2008	2008	Rajasthan	www.iitj.ac.in	238	3,308	—N/a
9	IIT Hyderabad	IITH	2008	2008	Telangana	www.iith.ac.in	306	3,946	₹300 crore (US$32 million)
10	IIT Gandhinagar	IITGN	2008	2008	Gujarat	www.iitgn.ac.in	143	2,010	—N/a
11	IIT Ropar	IITRPR	2008	2008	Punjab	www.iitrpr.ac.in	179	2,768	—N/a
12	IIT Patna	IITP	2008	2008	Bihar	www.iitp.ac.in	166	2,883	—N/a
13	IIT Bhubaneswar	IITBBS	2008	2008	Odisha	www.iitbbs.ac.in	178	2,597	—N/a
14	IIT Indore	IITI	2009	2009	Madhya Pradesh	www.iiti.ac.in	204	2,323	—N/a
15	IIT Mandi	IITMD	2009	2009	Himachal Pradesh	www.iitmandi.ac.in	197	2,343	—N/a
16	IIT (BHU) Varanasi	IITBHU	1919	2012	Uttar Pradesh	www.iitbhu.ac.in	381	7,980	—N/a
17	IIT Palakkad	IITPKD	2015	2015	Kerala	iitpkd.ac.in	127	1370	—N/a
18	IIT Tirupati	IITT	2015	2015	Andhra Pradesh	www.iittp.ac.in	119	1,168	—N/a
19	IIT (ISM) Dhanbad	IITISM	1926	2016	Jharkhand	www.iitism.ac.in	414	6,660	—N/a
20	IIT Bhilai	IITBH	2016	2016	Chhattisgarh	www.iitbhilai.ac.in	71	806	—N/a
21	IIT Dharwad	IITDH	2016	2016	Karnataka	www.iitdh.ac.in	86	866	—N/a
22	IIT Jammu	IITJMU	2016	2016	Jammu and Kashmir	www.iitjammu.ac.in	116	1,178	—N/a
23	IIT Goa	IITGOA	2016	2016	Goa	iitgoa.ac.in	68	591	—N/a

== Academics ==
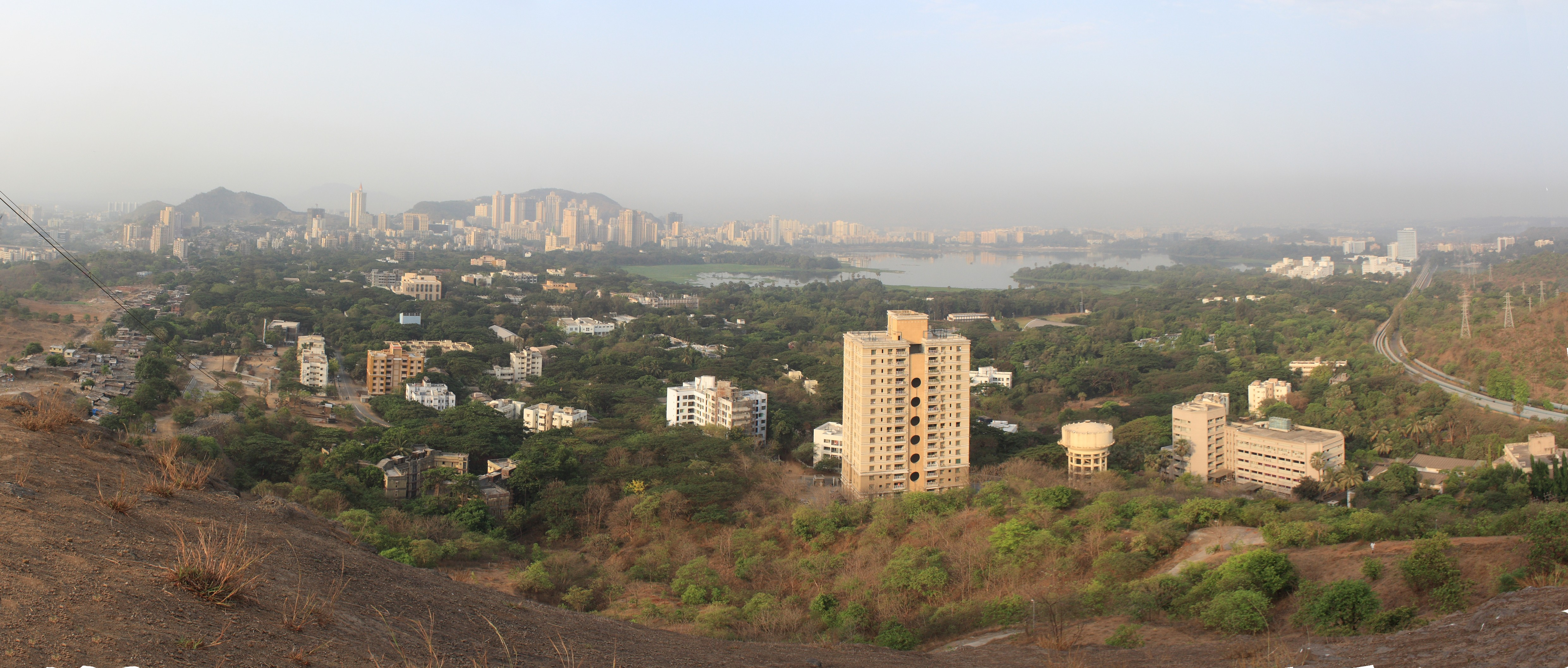
IIT Bombay

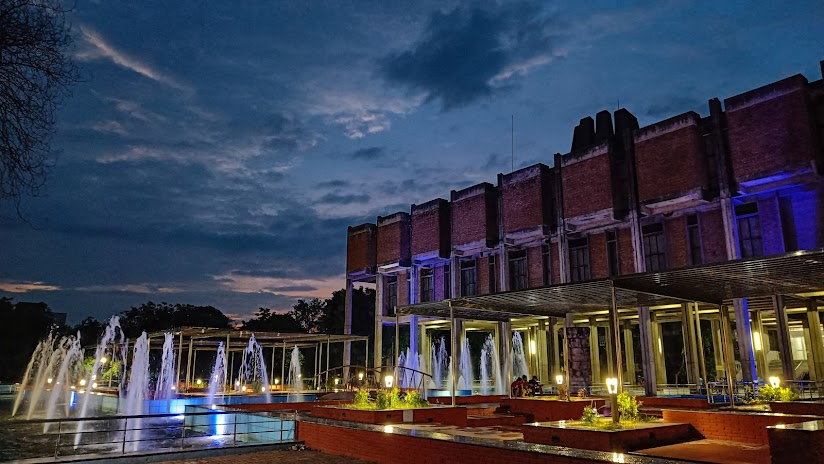
IIT Kanpur

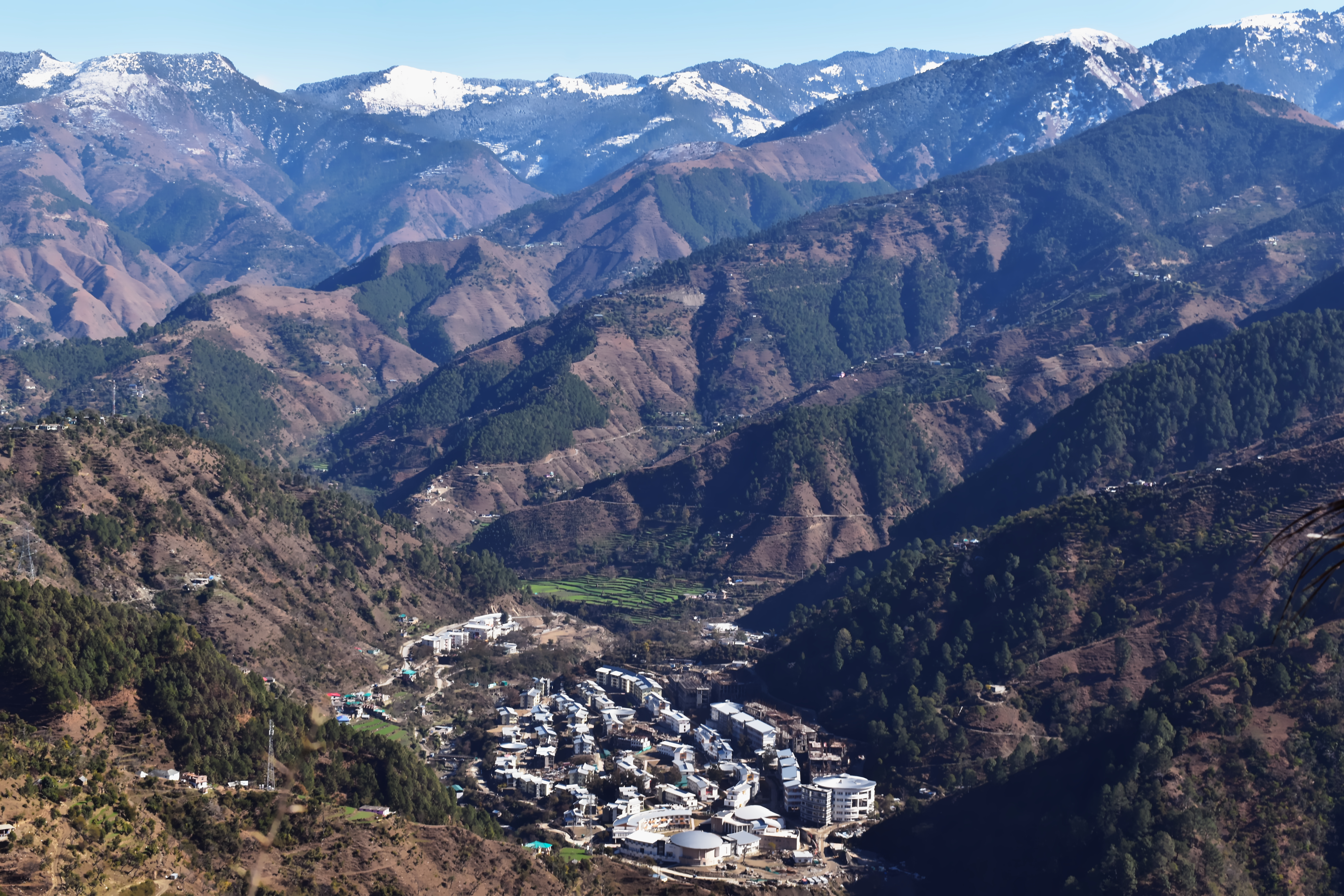
IIT Mandi

The IITs receive comparatively higher grants than other engineering colleges in India. While the total government funding to most other engineering colleges is around ₹ 100–200 million ($2–4 million) per year, the amount varies between ₹ 900–1300 million ($19–27 million) per year for each IIT. Other sources of funds include student fees and research funding from industry and contributions from the alumni. The faculty-to-student ratio in the IITs is between 1:6 and 1:8. The Standing Committee of IIT Council (SCIC) prescribes the lower limit for faculty-to-student ratio as 1:9, applied department wise. The IITs subsidize undergraduate student fees by approximately 80% and provide scholarships to all Master of Technology students and Research Scholars (PhD) to encourage students for higher studies, per the recommendations of the Thacker Committee (1959–1961). The cost borne by undergraduate students is around ₹280,000 per year. Students from the OBC, ST, SC categories, female students as well as physically challenged students are also entitled to scholarships.

The various IITs function autonomously, and their special status as Institutes of National Importance facilitates the smooth running of IITs, virtually free from both regional as well as student politics. Such autonomy means that IITs can create their curricula and adapt rapidly to the changes in educational requirements, free from bureaucratic hurdles. The government has no direct control over internal policy decisions of IITs (like faculty recruitment and curricula) but has representation on the IIT Council. The medium of instruction in all IITs is English. The electronic libraries allow students to access online journals and periodicals. The IITs and IISc, Bengaluru have taken an initiative along with Ministry of Education to provide free online videos of actual lectures of different disciplines under National Programme on Technology Enhanced Learning. This initiative is undertaken to make quality education accessible to all students.

The academic policies of each IIT are decided by its senate. This comprises all professors of the IIT and student representatives. Unlike many Western universities that have an elected senate, the IITs have an academic senate. It controls and approves the curriculum, courses, examinations and results, and appoints committees to look into specific academic matters. The teaching, training and research activities of the institute are periodically reviewed by the senate to maintain educational standards. The director of an IIT is the ex-officio chairman of the senate.

All the IITs follow the credits system of performance evaluation, with proportional weighting of courses based on their importance. The total marks (usually out of 100) form the basis of grades, with a grade value (out of 10) assigned to a range of marks. Sometimes, relative grading is done considering the overall performance of the whole class. For each semester, the students are graded on a scale of 0 to 10 based on their performance, by taking a weighted average of the grade points from all the courses, with their respective credit points. Each semester evaluation is done independently and then the weighted average over all semesters is used to calculate the cumulative Grade Point Average (known as CGPA or CPI—Cumulative Performance Index).

=== Undergraduate education degrees ===
The Bachelor of Technology (BTech) degree is the most common undergraduate degree in the IITs in terms of student enrollment, although Bachelor of Science (BS) degree, dual degrees integrating Master of Science or Master of Arts are also offered. The BTech course is based on a 4-year program with eight semesters, while the Dual Degree and Integrated courses are 5-year programs with ten semesters. In most IITs, the first year of BTech and Dual Degree courses are marked by a common course structure for all the students, though in some IITs, a single department introduction-related course is also included. The common courses include the basics from most of the departments like Computers, Electronics, Mechanics, Chemistry, Electrical and Physics. At the end of the first year (the end of the first semester at IIT Madras, IIT Bhilai, IIT Palakkad, and IIT Roorkee), an option to change departments is given to meritorious students based on their performance in the first two semesters. Few such changes ultimately take place as the criteria for them are usually strict, limited to the most meritorious students. Many IITs, such as IIT Bombay, IIT Hyderabad, IIT Kharagpur have abolished the practice of branch-change to reduce stress. Department-specific courses also begin earlier.

From the second year onward, the students study subjects exclusively from their respective departments. In addition to these, the students have to take compulsory advanced courses from other departments to broaden their education. Separate compulsory courses from humanities and social sciences departments, and sometimes management courses are also enforced. In the last year of their studies, most of the students are placed into industries and organisations via the placement process of the respective IIT, though some students opt out of this either when going for higher studies or when they take up jobs by applying to the companies directly.

Certain IITs, such as IIT Kanpur, IIT Kharagpur, IIT Hyderabad and IIT Gandhinagar, offer students the option to pursue a double major degree, allowing them to graduate with majors in different disciplines. Most IITs also allow students to graduate with undergraduate minors (from a different discipline) and/or honours (from the same discipline as the major).

=== Postgraduate education ===
==== Master's degrees and postgraduate diplomas ====
The IITs offer several postgraduate programs including Master of Technology (MTech), Master of Business Administration (MBA), and Master of Science (MSc). Some IITs offer specialised graduate programmes such as Master of Design (M.Des.), the Post Graduate Diploma in Information Technology (PGDIT), Masters in Medical Science and Technology (MMST), Masters in City Planning (MCP), Master of Arts (MA), Postgraduate Diploma in intellectual property Law (PGDIPL), and the Postgraduate Diploma in Maritime Operation & Management (PGDMOM).

Some of the IITs offer an M.S. (by research) program; the MTech and M.S. are similar to the US universities' non-thesis (course-based) and thesis (research-based) masters programs respectively. Admissions to master's programs in engineering are made using scores of the Graduate Aptitude Test in Engineering (GATE), while those to master's programs in science are made using scores of the Joint Admission Test for M.Sc. (JAM).

Several IITs have schools of management offering master's degrees in management or business administration.

In April 2015, IIT Bombay launched the first U.S.-India joint EMBA program alongside Washington University in St. Louis.

==== Bachelors-Masters dual degrees ====
The IITs also offer an unconventional BTech and MTech integrated educational program called "Dual Degree". It integrates undergraduate and postgraduate studies in selected areas of specialisation. It is completed in five years as against six years in conventional BTech (four years) followed by an MTech (two years). Integrated Master of Science programs are also offered at few IITs which integrates the Undergraduate and Postgraduate studies in Science streams in a single degree program against the conventional university system. These programs were started to allow its graduates to complete postgraduate studies from IIT rather than having to go to another institute.

=== Doctoral ===
The IITs also offer the Doctor of Philosophy degree (PhD) as part of their doctoral education programme. In it, the candidates are given a topic of academic interest by the ins or have to work on a consultancy project given by the industries. The duration of the program is usually unspecified and depends on the specific discipline. PhD candidates have to submit a dissertation as well as provide an oral defence for their thesis. Teaching Assistantships (TA) and Research Assistantships (RA) are often provided.

The IITs, along with NITs and IISc, account for nearly 80% of all engineering PhDs in India. IITs now allow admission in PhD programs without the mandatory GATE score.

== Culture and student life ==
All the IITs provide on-campus residential facilities to the students, research scholars and faculty. The students live in hostels (sometimes referred to as halls) throughout their stay in the IIT. Students in all IITs must choose among National Cadet Corps (NCC), National Service Scheme (NSS) and National Sports Organisation (NSO) in their first years. All the IITs have sports grounds for basketball, cricket, football (soccer), hockey, volleyball, lawn tennis, badminton, athletics and swimming pools for aquatic events. Usually, the hostels also have their own sports grounds.

An Inter IIT Sports Meet is organised annually where participants from all 23 IITs contest for the General Championship Trophy in 13 different sports. This, along with Inter IIT Cultural Meet and Tech Meet, are usually held annually in December.

=== Technical and cultural festivals ===
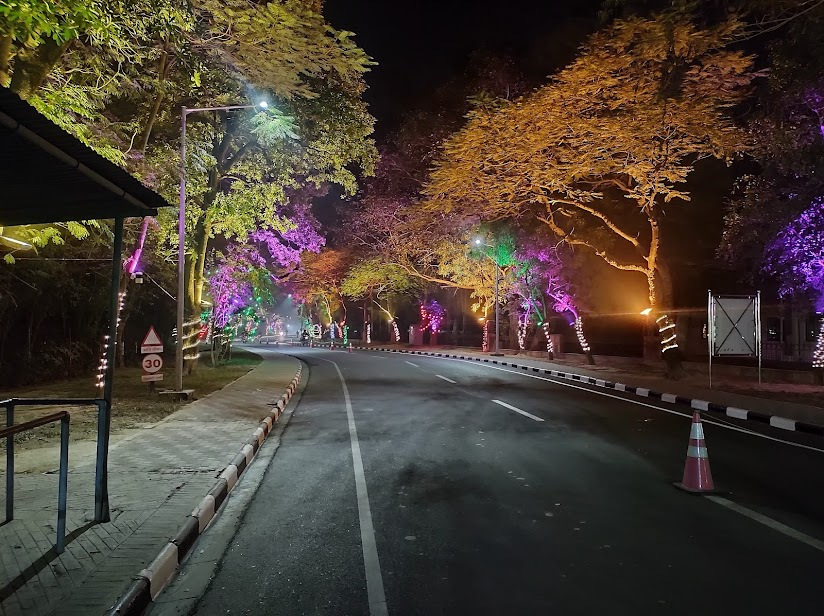
IIT Kanpur during Diwali

Rocknite in Saarang at IIT Madras

All IITs organize annual technical festivals, typically lasting three or four days. The technical festivals are Shaastra (IIT Madras), Advitiya (IIT Ropar), Kshitij (IIT Kharagpur), Techfest (IIT Bombay), Technex (IIT-BHU Varanasi), Cognizance (IIT Roorkee), Concetto (IIT-ISM Dhanbad), Tirutsava (IIT Tirupati), Nvision (IIT Hyderabad), Meraz (IIT Bhilai), Amalthea, (IIT Gandhinagar), Techkriti (IIT Kanpur), Tryst (IIT Delhi), Techniche (IIT Guwahati), Wissenaire (IIT Bhubaneswar), Technunctus (IIT Jammu), Xpecto (IIT Mandi), Fluxus (IIT Indore), Celesta (IIT Patna) and IGNUS (IIT Jodhpur) Petrichor(IIT Palakkad). Most of them are organized in January or March. Techfest (IIT Bombay) is also one of the most popular and largest technical festivals in Asia in terms of participants and prize money involved. It has been granted patronage from the United Nations Educational, Scientific and Cultural Organisation (UNESCO) for providing a platform for students to showcase their talent in science and technology. Shaastra holds the distinction of being the first student-managed event in the world to implement a formal Quality Management System, earning ISO 9001:2000 certification. Kshitij, which is branded as a techno-management festival due to its emphasis on both technology and management, is the largest of these festivals by sponsorship money.

Annual cultural festivals are also organized by the IITs and last three to four days. These include Thomso (IIT Roorkee), Kashiyatra (IIT BHU Varanasi), Alcheringa (IIT Guwahati), Exodia (IIT Mandi), Saarang and Paradox (annual fests of IIT Madras BTech and BS Degree respectively), Spring Fest (IIT Kharagpur, also known as SF), Rendezvous (IIT Delhi), Meraz (IIT Bhilai), Tirutsava (IIT Tirupati), Srijan, (earlier known as Saturnalia, IIT Dhanbad), Tarang (culfest) (previously Rave), Anwesha (IIT Patna), SPANDAN (IIT Jodhpur), Renao (IIT Jammu), Petrichor (IIT Palakkad), Blithchron (IIT Gandhinagar), ELAN (IIT Hyderabad), Alma Fiesta (IIT Bhubaneswar), Mood Indigo (IIT Bombay, also known as Mood-I), Antaragni (IIT Kanpur) and Zeitgeist (IIT Ropar).

== Academic rankings ==
IITs have generally ranked as the top engineering colleges in India. In the 2025 NIRF rankings published by Ministry of Education, India, the IITs also hold the following top 10 positions in various categories:

- 9 out of 10 in Engineering
- 8 out of 10 in Innovation
- 7 out of 10 in Research
- 6 out of 10 in Overall Rankings
- 3 out of 10 in Sustainable Development Goals
- 2 out of 10 in Architecture and Planning
- 1 out of 10 in Management

IIT Madras has been ranked 1st for ten consecutive years in the Engineering Category and for seven consecutive years in the Overall Category.

National rankings of all IITs
Name	NIRF Engineering				NIRF Overall					
Name	2025	2024	2023	2022	2025	2024	2023	2022	2021	2020
IIT Madras	1	1	1	1	1	1	1	1	1	1
IIT Delhi	2	2	2	2	4	4	3	4	3	3
IIT Bombay	3	3	3	3	3	3	4	3	4	4
IIT Kanpur	4	4	4	4	5	5	5	5	6	6
IIT Kharagpur	5	5	6	5	6	6	7	6	5	5
IIT Roorkee	6	6	5	6	7	8	8	7	9	8
IIT Jodhpur	27	28	30	30	66	68	66	N/A		
IIT Hyderabad	7	8	8	9	12	12	14	16	17	22
IIT Guwahati	8	7	7	7	11	9	9	8	7	9
IIT (BHU) Varanasi	10	10	15	13	31	30	31	28	26	28
IIT Indore	12	16	14	16	27	33	28	30	23	N/A
IIT (ISM) Dhanbad	15	15	17	14	35	35	42	26	22	25
IIT Patna	19	34	41	33	36	73	66	51	54	58
IIT Gandhinagar	25	18	18	23	39	29	24	33	35	51
IIT Mandi	26	31	33	20	58	72	73	82	67	44
IIT Ropar	32	22	22	22	56	48	33	31	39	29
IIT Bhubaneswar	39	54	47	36	80	N/A	91	58	56	46
IIT Jammu	56	62	67	N/A	N/A					
IIT Tirupati	57	61	59	56	N/A					
IIT Palakkad	64	64	69	68	N/A					
IIT Bhilai	72	73	81	N/A	N/A					
IIT Dharwad	77	N/A	93	N/A	N/A					
IIT Goa	N/A			N/A	N/A					

According to Outlook India's Top Engineering Colleges of 2017, the top four engineering colleges in India were IITs. In 2026 QS World University Ranking, IIT Delhi ranked highest at 123, followed by IIT Bombay (129), IIT Madras (180), IIT Kharagpur (215), IIT Kanpur (222). Five IITs are ranked in the top 100 of the QS World Engineering ranking.

World rankings of all IITs
Name	2026 QS Engineering	2026 QS World	2023 QS World	2022 QS World	2021 QS World	2022 QS Asia	2020 QS India	Times World	Times Asia
IIT Delhi	26	123	185	193	182	45	3	401–500 (2020)	67 (2020)
IIT Bombay	28	129	177	172	152	42	1	401–500 (2020)	69 (2020)
IIT Madras	53	180	255	275	271	54	4	601–800 (2020)	125 (2020)
IIT Kharagpur	60	215	280	314	281	60	5	401–500 (2020)	59 (2020)
IIT Kanpur	72	222	277	350	291	64	6	601–800 (2020)	125 (2020)
IIT Roorkee	131	339	400	383	383	109	9	501–600 (2020)	83 (2020)
IIT Guwahati	140	334	395	470	491	119	10	601–800 (2020)	160 (2020)
IIT Hyderabad	501-550	664	N/A			224	15	601–800 (2021)	144 (2021)
IIT (BHU) Varanasi	501-550	566	N/A			281–290	N/A		
IIT Indore	N/A	556	N/A			178	13	401–500 (2022)	78 (2021)
IIT Gandhinagar	N/A	801-850	N/A			301–350	N/A	601–800 (2022)	N/A
IIT Bhubaneswar	N/A	951-1000	N/A			251–260	20	1001–1200 (2022)	251–300 (2021)
IIT (ISM) Dhanbad	N/A					251–260	46	1001–1200 (2022)	201–250 (2021)
IIT Mandi	N/A					N/A		1001–1200 (2022)	N/A
IIT Ropar	N/A					261–270	25	351–400 (2022)	55 (2021)
IIT Patna	N/A					301–350	36	801–1000 (2022)	301–350 (2021)
IIT Jodhpur	N/A								
IIT Tirupati	N/A								
IIT Palakkad	N/A								
IIT Bhilai	N/A								
IIT Dharwad	N/A								
IIT Jammu	N/A								
IIT Goa	N/A								

== Criticism ==
The IITs have faced criticism from within and outside academia. Major concerns include allegations that they encourage brain drain and that their stringent entrance examinations encourage coaching colleges and put heavy pressure on students. Recently, some prominent IIT students have also questioned the quality of teaching and research in IITs.

With the tripling the number of IITs in recent decades, the newly created institutes have struggled to establish themselves compared to their peers. A 2021 report by Comptroller and Auditor General of India criticized the newer IITs for not meeting targets for research, faculty and student recruitment, students retention, as well as for being beset with infrastructure delays.

In the recent past, the number of student suicides has attracted significant attention.

According to data obtained through Right to Information (RTI) applications, approximately 38% of Indian Institute of Technology (IIT) graduates from the class of 2024 have not secured job placements. This is the highest percentage in the past three years, with a steady increase from 19% in 2021 and 21% in 2022.

=== Brain drain ===
Among the criticisms of the IIT system by the media and academia, a common notion is that it encourages brain drain. Until liberalisation started in the early 1990s, India experienced large scale emigration of IIT graduates to developed countries, especially to the United States. Since 1953, nearly twenty-five thousand IIT graduates have settled in the US. Since the US benefited from subsidized education in IITs at the cost of Indian taxpayers' money, critics say that subsidising education in IITs is useless. Others support the emigration of graduates, arguing that the capital sent home by the IIT graduates has been a major source of the expansion of foreign exchange reserves for India, which, until the 1990s, had a substantial trade deficit. A 2023 study by the National Bureau of Economic Research found that among the top 1,000 JEE scorers, 36% migrated abroad, while for the top 100 scorers, the rate was 62%, primarily to the U.S. and for graduate school.

This trend has been reversed somewhat (dubbed the reverse brain drain) as hundreds of IIT graduates, who have pursued further studies in the US, started returning to India in the 1990s. The extent of intellectual loss receded substantially over the 1990s and 2000s, with the percentage of students going abroad dropping from as high as 70% at one time to around 30% in 2005. This is largely attributed to the liberalization of the Indian economy and the opening of previously closed markets. Government initiatives are encouraging IIT students into entrepreneurship programs and are increasing foreign investment. Emerging scientific and manufacturing industries, and outsourcing of technical jobs from North America and Western Europe have created opportunities for aspiring graduates in India. Additionally, IIT alumni are giving back generously to their parent institutions.

One factor of brain drain has been attributed to the reservation of seats in IITs, particularly for underprivileged and scheduled castes and tribes. The reservation system, without reforms, has denied fair opportunities to unreserved students, who opt for other universities worldwide, many of which are top ranked.

=== Entrance competition ===
The highly competitive examination in the form of JEE-Advanced has led to the establishment of a large number of coaching institutes throughout the country that provide intensive, and specific preparation for the JEE-Advanced for substantial fees. It is argued that this favours students from specific regions and richer backgrounds. Some coaching institutes say that they have individually coached nearly 800 successful candidates year after year. According to some estimates, nearly 95% of all students who clear the JEE-Advanced had joined coaching classes. Indeed, this was the case regarding preparation for IIT entrance exams even decades ago. In a January 2010 lecture at the Indian Institute of Science, the 2009 Nobel laureate in Chemistry, Venkatraman Ramakrishnan revealed that he failed to get a seat at any of the Indian engineering and medical colleges. He also said that his parents, being old-fashioned, did not believe in coaching classes to prepare for the IIT entrance exam and considered them to be "nonsense".

In a documentary aired by CBS, Vinod Khosla, co-founder of Sun Microsystems, states, "The IITs probably are the hardest schools in the world to get into, to the best of my knowledge". The documentary further concludes, "Put Harvard, MIT, and Princeton together, and you begin to get an idea of the status of IIT in India" to depict the competition as well as demand for the elite institutes. Furthermore, the IITs, despite being premier institutions, do not accept SAT scores for entrance and admission, which have been noted to be comparatively easier than the JEE.

Not all children are of a similar aptitude level and may be skilled in different paradigms and fields. This has led to criticism of the way the examinations are conducted and the way a student is forced in the Indian community. The IIT-JEE (Now JEE-Advanced) format was restructured in 2006 following these complaints. After the change to the objective pattern of questioning, even the students who initially considered themselves not fit for subjective pattern of IIT-JEE decided to take the examination. Though the restructuring was meant to reduce the dependence of students on coaching classes, it led to an increase in students registering for coaching classes. Some people (mostly IIT graduates) have criticized the changed pattern of the JEE-Advanced. They reason that while JEE-Advanced is traditionally used to test students' understanding of fundamentals and their ability to apply them to solve tough unseen problems, the current pattern does not stress much on the application part and might lead to a reduced quality of students.

JEE-Advanced is conducted only in English and Hindi, making it harder for students with regional languages as their main language. In September 2011, the Gujarat High Court acted on a public interest litigation by the Gujarati Sahitya Parishad, for conducting the exams in Gujarati. A second petition was made in October by Navsari's Sayaji Vaibhav Sarvajanik Pustakalaya Trust. Another petition was made at the Madras High Court for conducting the exam in Tamil. In the petition, it was claimed that not conducting the exam in the regional languages violates article 14 of the Constitution of India. IIT council recommended major changes in entrance examination structure which is effective from 2017 onwards.

=== Curriculum and academic issues ===
In comparison with other universities worldwide, the IITs have been consistently plagued with quality issues in curriculum and academics, which has caused mental stress to students. The response from administration has been noted to be insensitive, after several students have complained from stress, besides unhealthy competition. This has led to an increase in students dropping out of the IITs at a high pace, prompting concerns. Furthermore, across almost all IITs, caste discrimination and institutional bullying of students who come under reserved quota is rampant, which affects academics and eventually leads to student suicides or dropping out.

In 2022, IIT Delhi began to revamp the curriculum to keep up pace with new trends in technology. IIT Kharagpur brought major changes to the curriculum in 2024. IIT Hyderabad introduced fractal academics for increased academic flexibility for the students; since its inception, the curricula are frequent updated. It has led IITs in removal of branch change to reduce student stress, a bachelor's program on AI, introduction of double major and minor, among other academic options.

In September 2026, an IIT-Bombay Professor, Suryanarayana Doolla, faced major outrage for allegedly using caste slurs against a student Sahil Wakode, after he was caught cheating during an exam using ChatGPT, and later taken his own life. Doolla was interrogated by the Mumbai Police for his actions, stating that he tried to stop academic malpractice by asking Wakode to leave and denied using any caste slurs against Wakode. Wakode's parents attempted to protest against the handling of the case, which continues to be investigated as of October 2026. The case also sparked issues on handling of academic malpractices.

=== Caste discrimination in IITs ===
IITs practice affirmative action as part of India's constitutional framework for addressing historical social and educational disadvantage, with reservation policies applying to Scheduled Caste (SC), Scheduled Tribe (ST), Other Backward Classes (OBC), and, under subsequent policy developments, other categories such as Economically Weaker Section (EWS) and Persons with Disabilities (PwD). However, the history of the IITs shows that the relationship between caste, reservation and the idea of academic "merit" has been contested since the institutions were established. Ajantha Subramanian, in her study Making Merit: The Indian Institutes of Technology and the Social Life of Caste, argues that the IITs were originally granted a distinctive institutional status partly through their exemption from reservation policies, with admission presented as being based on merit and the Joint Entrance Examination (JEE) becoming the principal symbol of that meritocratic ideal. Reservation for SCs and STs was extended to the IITs in 1973, when 22.5% of seats were reserved for these groups, followed by the introduction of 27% reservation for OBCs in 2006.

Subramanian notes that the expansion of reservation altered the social meaning of the "general category", which had previously been treated as an apparently universal and caste-neutral category associated with merit, but increasingly became understood in relation to an upper-caste identity. She argues that the apparent neutrality of the general category can obscure the historical accumulation of social, cultural and educational advantages available to sections of the upper castes. According to her analysis, many IIT students came from upper-caste professional families, including families of bureaucrats, teachers and academics, where educational capital had been accumulated across generations. This capital could take the form of familiarity with prestigious educational institutions, English-language competence, access to professional networks, urban social environments, and forms of cultural knowledge that were not necessarily visible in the examination score itself but could nevertheless contribute to the ability to prepare for and succeed in the highly competitive JEE.

Subramanian therefore questions the assumption that the IITian can be understood simply as an individually gifted and socially disembedded student whose success is entirely detached from caste and family background. Instead, she describes the process through which inherited "caste capital" and social and cultural capital can be converted into what is subsequently recognized as modern educational and professional merit.

The paper also examines how the language of merit could itself contribute to the continued invisibility of upper-caste privilege: because the general category was presented as "merit-based", the students within it could be treated as individuals who had succeeded solely through their own ability, while students entering through reserved categories were more readily identified through their caste status. Subramanian argues that this distinction encouraged the perception of the general category as casteless and the reserved category as caste-marked, even though both groups were participating in an educational system shaped by historically unequal access to schooling, resources and social capital.

Her detailed case study of IIT Madras further illustrates how caste and educational background could intersect. She describes the historical overrepresentation of Tamil Brahmins in modern professions and notes that, in Tamil Nadu, Central Board schools and JEE preparation were particularly associated with sections of the professional middle class. Her interviews suggested that these educational institutions could function as important feeder environments for IIT admission, with Central Board students and JEE coaching providing forms of preparation that were treated as evidence of intellectual aptitude or "natural" suitability for the IIT system. She also records instances in which students admitted through the general category at IIT Madras were implicitly assumed to be Brahmin, illustrating how the supposedly caste-neutral category could itself become associated with upper-caste identity. In one account, a Backward Caste student from the general category was assumed by his Brahmin roommate to be Brahmin, demonstrating what Subramanian describes as a form of caste misrecognition in which entry into the IIT could itself carry an assumption of upper-caste status. At the same time, the paper describes the experience of students from reserved communities after admission and argues that formal access to the IITs did not necessarily eliminate caste distinctions within campus life.

Subramanian reports that SC and ST students who entered the IITs from the early 1980s onward often experienced difficulties integrating into campus communities. In interviews with former students and others familiar with the IITs, SC/ST students were described as a visibly distinct group and their academic performance, clothing and command of English were sometimes interpreted through assumptions about caste and intellectual ability. The paper gives the example of identical academic outcomes being interpreted differently depending on caste category: poor grades among general-category students could be attributed to leisure or other circumstances, whereas similar grades among SC/ST students were sometimes interpreted as evidence of intellectual inadequacy. Subramanian further states that students who entered through the SC/ST quota experienced routine slights and indignities and describes their alienation within institutional settings, linking these experiences to reported cases of suicides and attempted suicides involving SC/ST students at IIT campuses, while drawing on earlier studies and contemporary journalistic accounts for this part of the discussion.

The author does not present these observations as evidence that every IIT student or every campus is uniformly discriminatory, but rather uses them to demonstrate how caste could continue to structure social interactions and perceptions even inside an institution that formally defined itself through merit and academic excellence. The introduction of OBC reservation in 2006 generated another major controversy. Subramanian describes strong protests by students and faculty against the extension of 27% OBC reservation to central educational institutions, with opponents characterizing the policy as a threat to "meritocracy" and associating reservation with "vote-bank politics". The paper argues that these debates were significant because they increasingly transformed merit from a supposedly universal criterion into a category explicitly associated with upper-caste status. Following the OBC expansion, the reserved category came to constitute almost half of the student population in the author's account, and the general category was correspondingly redefined in social terms as an upper-caste collective rather than simply a neutral category of students admitted without reservation. Subramanian also discusses the views of IIT Madras director P. V. Indiresan, who opposed aspects of reservation and contrasted the "socially-deprived" with the "talented". She interprets this distinction as significant because those receiving the benefits of the general category were described through the language of talent and merit, rather than as socially advantaged groups. More broadly, her argument is that caste at the IITs should not be understood solely as overt exclusion or as formal discrimination in admissions. It can also operate through the social production of merit itself: through unequal access to educational resources, inherited cultural capital, professional networks, assumptions about intellectual ability, the social interpretation of reservation, and the tendency to regard upper-caste achievement as individual merit while treating historically disadvantaged students primarily through their caste category. In her conclusion, Subramanian argues that the apparent opposition between merit and reservation reflects two competing understandings of equality: one based on formal equal treatment and individual achievement, and another that takes account of historically accumulated advantages and disadvantages and therefore views compensatory measures as necessary to equalize opportunity. She concludes that the IIT experience demonstrates the difficulty of treating merit as completely separate from social history, because standardized measures of achievement can themselves operate within a society marked by unequal distributions of cultural and social capital.

=== Resignation of a professor alleging caste discrimination 2021 ===
A further case involving caste discrimination at IIT Madras emerged in 2021, when Vipin Puthiyedathveetil, an Assistant Professor of Economics in the Department of Humanities and Social Sciences, who did his PhD from United States, resigned from the institute after alleging that he had faced caste discrimination since joining in March 2019. In his resignation letter, which he circulated publicly, Vipin alleged that OBC and SC/ST faculty members faced significant discrimination at the institute and stated that there had been multiple instances of discrimination involving individuals in positions of power. He said that the alleged discrimination was not limited to individuals belonging to any particular political affiliation or gender. Vipin called for greater investigation into the experiences of SC, ST and OBC faculty and suggested the creation of a committee including representatives from the SC/ST and OBC commissions and psychologists to examine the issue. The allegations were reported in the Indian media in July 2021, although IIT Madras itself did not provide a substantive response to the allegations in the report, stating that complaints from employees and students were addressed through its established grievance-redressal procedures. The episode subsequently became part of the wider public discussion concerning whether formal equality and institutional grievance mechanisms are sufficient to address caste-based discrimination within India's premier higher-education institutions

Vipin later joined IIM Kozhikode as a Professor of Economics.

== See also ==
- Indian Institutes of Management (IIMs)
- Indian Institutes of Information Technology (IIITs)
- National Institutes of Technology (NITs)
- National Institute of Design (NID)
- Government Funded Technical Institutes (GFTIs)
- Institutes of National Importance (INIs)
- PanIIT Alumni India (IITs Alumni Association)
