= Alma Fiesta =

Annual socio-cultural festival in Bhubaneswar, Odisha, India

- Genre: Socio-Cultural festival
- Locations: Bhubaneswar, India
- Founded: 2009
- Major events: Euphony, Perspective, Face Off, Topsy Turvy, Alma Fiesta Youth Quiz, Blind Strokes etc.
- Filing status: Student Run, Non-Profit Organization
- Sponsor: Indian Institute of Technology Bhubaneswar
- Slogan: Redefining Festivity
- Website: www.almafiesta.in

Alma Fiesta (Spanish trsl: Festival of the Soul) is the annual socio-cultural festival of the Indian Institute of Technology in Bhubaneswar. It is a three-day-long event usually held during the second week of January every year. The first edition of Alma Fiesta took place in 2010. It was inaugurated by Naveen Patnaik, Chief Minister of Odisha.

== Introduction ==
Alma Fiesta, the socio-cultural festival of IIT Bhubaneswar is conducted solely by the efforts of the students of IIT Bhubaneswar. All the activities of the fest such as Marketing, Publicity, Events management, Design and Decoration, is managed by the students.

== Events ==
=== Star Nites ===
Alma Fiesta organizes three mega star nites, one on each of the three evenings of the fest. The three shows include :

- Leela

Leela is the Indian Classical Music/Dance show.

- Head Bang

Headbang is the heavy-metal star nite.

- Lamhe

Lamhe is the Bollywood musical night of Alma. Alma Fiesta 2011 has played host to Krishna Beura and the next edition witnessed a performance by Bandish. Last year saw a performance by Nikhil D'souza, a Bollywood playback singer. Hindi poet Kumar Vishwas.

Alma Fiesta Star Nites
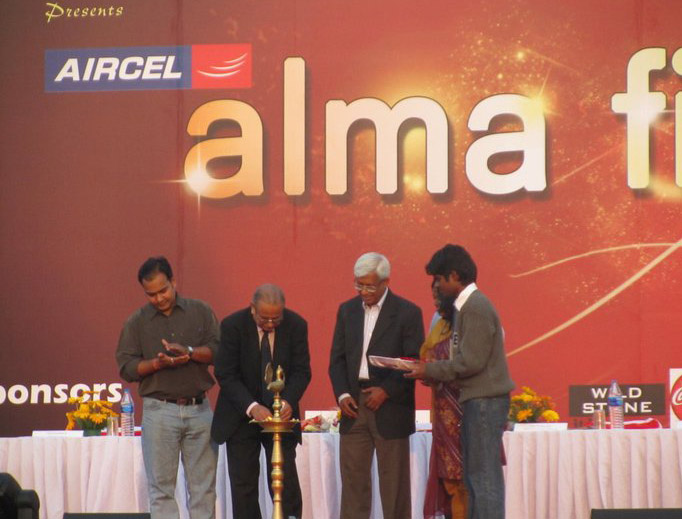
Inauguration of Alma Fiesta 2011 by Prof. P. Rama Rao

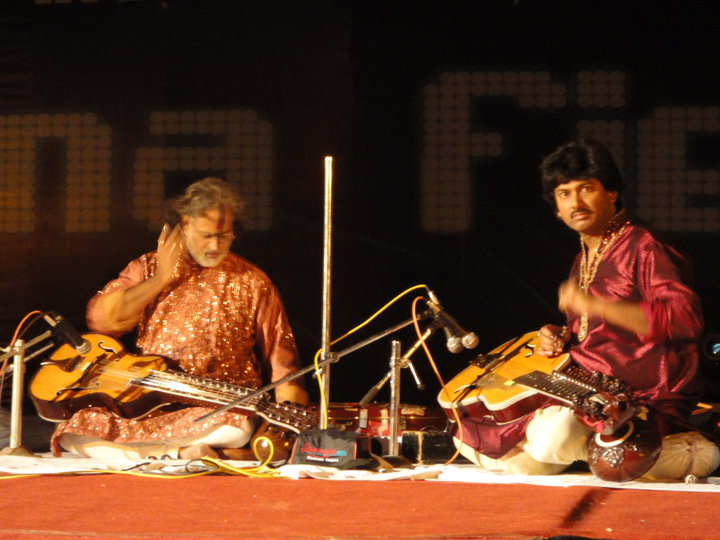
PT. Vishwa Mohan Bhatt performing at AF 2010

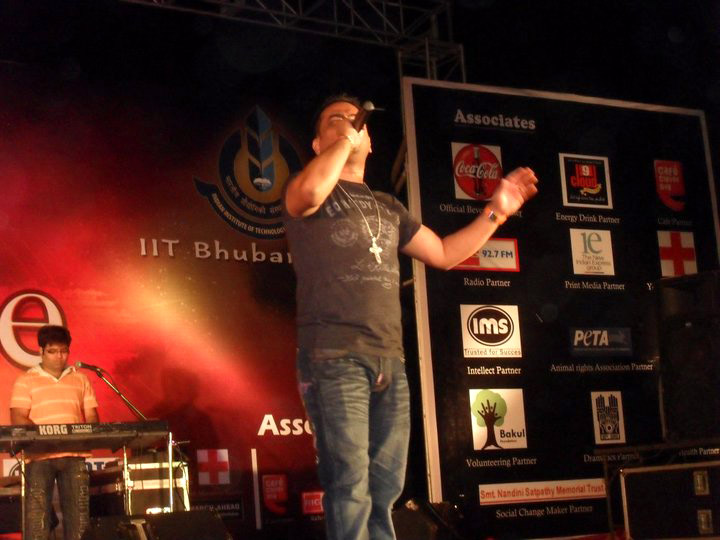
Krishna Beura at Alma Fiesta 2011

=== Competitive Events ===
At Alma Fiesta, competitions cover art, music, dance, and drama. Euphony, the band competition witnesses bands from all over the country.

==== Literary Events ====
- Perspective - The social case study competition. Presented in association with the SNSMT. The winner is awarded SNSMT-IIT BBSR Social Change Maker Award. The award was won by Ipsit Bibhudarshi and Barsha Behera of IGIT Sarang for the year 2012.
- Litspree - Anagrams, charades, extempore, spelling bee and crosswords
- Gone in Sixty Seconds - The Alma Fiesta version of the single minute extempore

==== Fine Arts events ====
- Leaf It Up - The leaf collage competition
- Shadez - An event for pencil sketching
- Blind Strokes - A blind folded drawing competition
- Trash Can Novelties - An event to create art by recycling junk.

==== Other events ====
- Alma Fiesta Youth Quiz - A general quizzing event
- Run against the AIDS - A youth marathon to spread awareness against AIDS

=== Model United Nations(MUN) ===
Model United Nations involves researching, public speaking, debating, and writing skills, in addition to critical thinking, teamwork, and leadership abilities. Participants in Model UN conferences, known as delegates, are placed in committees and assigned countries, or occasionally other organizations or political figures, where they represent members of that body.
