= IIT Bhubaneswar =

Research institute in Odisha, India

Indian Institute of Technology Bhubaneswar
- Type: Public technical university
- Established: 22 July 2008; 18 years ago
- Academic affiliations: Institute of National Importance
- Budget: ₹250.23 crore (US$26 million) (FY2024–25 est.)
- Chairman: Rajendra Prasad Singh
- Director: Shreepad Karmalkar
- Academic staff: 223
- Students: 3,184
- Undergraduates: 1,977
- Postgraduates: 648
- Doctoral students: 559
- Location: Argul, Khordha district, Odisha, India- 752050; 20°18′10.9434″N 85°49′26.45″E
- Campus: Rural 936 acres (3.79 km^{2})
- Website: www.iitbbs.ac.in

Indian Institute of Technology Bhubaneswar (IIT Bhubaneswar or IIT BBS) is a public technical university established by the government of India in 2008, located at Kansapada village, Khordha district, Odisha, India. It is located 24 km south of Bhubaneswar and 4 km from Jatni, but is named after Bhubaneswar.

The institute admits students for bachelor's and master's programs via JEE Advanced and Graduate Aptitude Test in Engineering respectively. The permanent campus at Kansapada was inaugurated by prime minister Narendra Modi on 24 December 2018. Its areas of research are science, engineering and humanities.

== History and establishment ==
=== Demand and political movement for IIT in Odisha ===
Establishing an IIT in Odisha was a long-standing demand for several decades. As the state ranked at the bottom in terms of centrally funded academic and research institutions, there were strong allegations of Congress-led central government neglect. There were several incidents of protest, both locally in Odisha, the National Students Union of India (NSUI), and eminent nonresident Indian academics. An organization called Agamee Odisha was formed, that spearheaded mass agitation throughout the state. There also have been stray incidents of violence related to the issue of Odisha's neglect. Politicians including the Chief Minister of Odisha, Naveen Patnaik, cast this festering issue as a sign of severe neglect of the state by the UPA government in New Delhi. In May 2007, this became a major issue in the Indian parliament. The opposition NDA staged a walk-out in the Indian parliament, accusing the ruling UPA of neglecting the state's economic development. Sections of the media reported that the Congress party led UPA government had been embarrassed by this issue. Eventually, the HRD minister Arjun Singh relented, leading to the inception of IIT Bhubaneswar.

=== Announcement and approval ===
Indian Institute of Technology Bhubaneswar was announced on the 60th anniversary of the India's independence, on 15 August 2007, when Prime Minister Manmohan Singh made the announcement about the expansion of IIT system in the country. Further, the National Development Council of the Planning Commission, in its 54th meeting held on 19 December 2007, approved the proposal as part of the 11th Five Year Plan (2007–12).

=== Mentorship and initial administration ===
The actual birth of the institute was announced by the Minister of Human Resource Development, Arjun Singh, in a press conference on 28 March 2008. The Ministry of Human Resource Development, Department of Higher Education, Government of India, on 9 May 2008 decided that IIT Kharagpur would mentor the setting up of this new IIT for 2–3 years. It was further decided that the Director of IIT Kharagpur would be the mentor Director of the new IIT, and, pending the selection of a regular chairman and Board of Governors (BOG), IIT Kharagpur's chairman and BOG would mentor IIT Bhubaneswar.

=== Government approval and legal formation ===
The Union Cabinet, at its meeting held on 17 July 2008, approved setting up eight new IITs including IIT Bhubaneswar at a cost of ₹760 crore (US$79 million) per IIT. The Cabinet also approved creation of the post of Director and Registrar along with 30 faculty per year for each of the new IITs. It was also decided that pending amendment of the Institute of Technology Act, 1961 for inclusion of IIT Bhubaneswar as an Institute of National Importance, the Institute would start functioning under aegis of Indian Institute of Technology Bhubaneswar Society to be registered under the Societies' Registration Act, 1860 (Act XXI of 1860). Papers were filed on 19 July 2008 with the Registrar of Societies Odisha, Cuttack, for registration of IIT Bhubaneswar Society and the society was registered on 22 July 2018.

=== Inauguration and Institute of National Importance status ===
IIT Bhubaneswar became the first amongst the eight new IITs to become operational with a sanctioned intake of 40 students each in the disciplines of civil, mechanical and electrical engineering. Classes for the first batch of students started from the campus of IIT Kharagpur at Kharagpur, the mentor Institute for IIT Bhubaneswar, on 23 July 2008 with admission of 95 students. IIT Bhubaneswar became an Institute of National Importance from 29 June 2012 with notification of Amendment in the Institutes' of Technology Act, 1961 by the Ministry of Human Resource Development, (Department of Higher Education) Government of India.

The process of selection of faculty and the registrar were initiated through an issue of advertisement on all India basis. Bata Kishore Ray from MHRD Government of India joined as the first employee and first registrar of the institute on 31 December 2008.

=== Campus selection and operational relocation ===
To finalise the site for the permanent campus of IIT Bhubaneswar, the MHRD set up a Site Identification Committee under the chairmanship of Ashok Thakur, Additional Secretary to the Government of India, who visited Odisha during 24–25 December 2008. After visiting four sites proposed by the Government of Odisha in Banki, Ramdaspur in Cuttack district and Gayabandh and Jatni in Khordha district, the Committee recommended the site at Jatni. The recommendation of the committee was approved by the Government of India on 13 January 2009. The Government of Odisha agreed to provide 936 acres (3.79 km^{2}) of land free of cost out of which 518 acres (2.10 km^{2}) was given physical possession on 10 February 2009. The state government also agreed to provide other facilities including a four-lane road from National Highway No.5 (Kolkata-Chennai) to the IIT. Prof M Chakraborty, deputy director, IIT Kharagpur joined as the Director of IIT Bhubaneswar on 19 May 2009. He took over the rein from Prof D. Acharya, the earlier Director of the institute. IIT Bhubaneswar became operational at its Bhubaneswar campus on 22 July 2009, with shifting of 2008 batch of students from IIT Kharagpur and admission of 117 new students in 2009. The Institute started functioning at IIT Kharagpur's Extension Centre built in 1998 in Bhubaneswar.

== Campus and location ==
=== Permanent campus ===
The Government of Odisha allotted about 936 acres (3.79 km^{2}) of government land for the permanent campus of the institute. In addition, the state government was acquiring about 16 acres of private land at its own cost to make the land contiguous. The foundation stone of the permanent campus at Arugul, on the outskirts of Jatni and 24 km from Bhubaneswar, was laid on 12 February 2009.

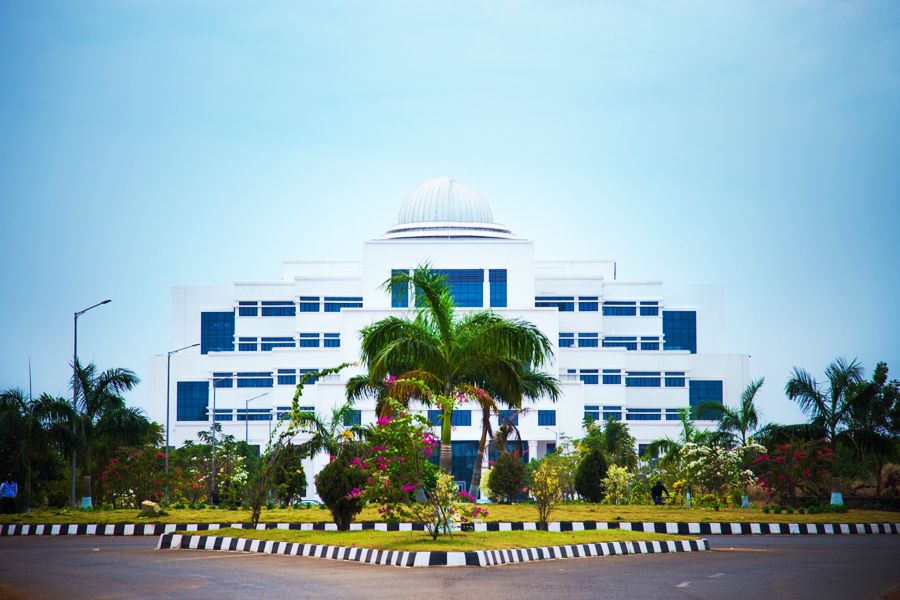
Administrative Building of IIT Bhubaneswar

The site near Jatni railway station on the East Coast Railway is 35 kilometres from Biju Patnaik Airport Bhubaneswar. The land is picturesque with Barunai Hill on one side and a reserve forest nearby. The self-contained campus would have a capacity of nearly 10,000 students and 1,100 faculty. A science park was set up as a part of this institution to support industry oriented research activities. The campus construction began on 14 August 2011, after chief minister Naveen Patnaik laid the foundation stone of the IIT campus at Aragul village near Jatni. The campus master plan has been prepared by Vastunidhi Architects, Noida. The institute started operating in its new campus at Arugul from academic year 2015–16.

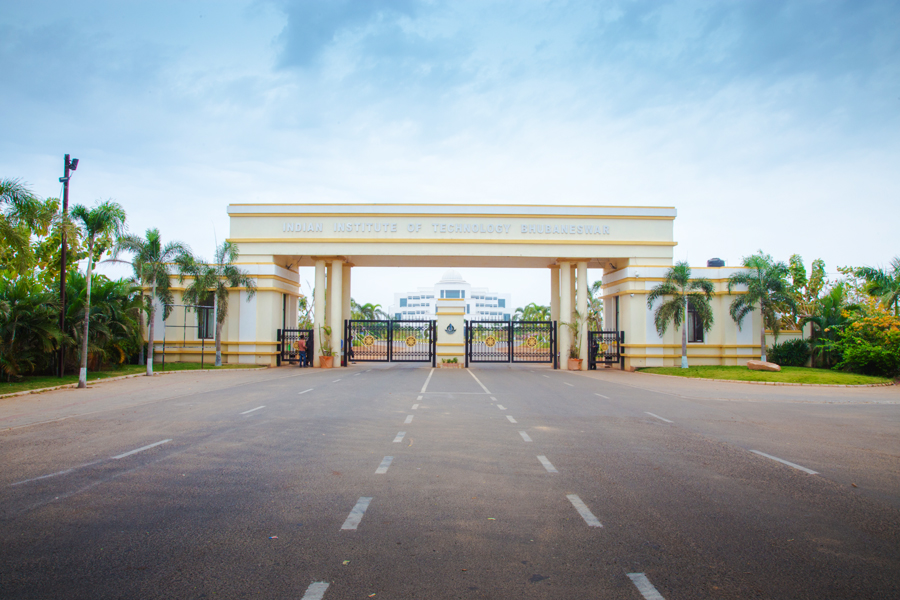
Main Gate of IIT Bhubaneswar

==== Marine campus ====
IIT Bhubaneswar is the first IIT to set up a separate marine campus in 2011 for conducting research in rising sea levels, ecology, disaster management, marine ecosystems, fishery development, and other areas. This campus, which will be a part of the School of Earth, Ocean and Environment Sciences, will be set up near Chilka lake. It will have educational facilities for undergraduate and postgraduate students.

=== Temporary campuses ===
The institute used to operate from a number of locations within the city of Bhubaneswar which included Extension Centre of IIT Kharagpur, Toshali Bhawan, and Workshop cum Laboratory Complex near IIT Kharagpur Extension Centre for laboratory facilities, particularly of 3rd and 4th year students. Besides, the institute also received support from other institutes viz. Institute of Minerals and Materials Technology and Central Tool Room & Training Centre for laboratory and workshop facilities, respectively.

=== Hostel and housing ===
Hostel facilities to students have been provided through a 200 capacity Dr. A. N. Khosla Hall of Residence of IIT Kharagpur near its Extension Center. In addition, the institute has two hostels (started in July 2015) at its permanent campus, Mahanadi Hall of Residence (MHR) of 800 capacity for boys and Subarnarekha Hall of Residence (SHR) for girls of 200 capacity. The institute has also provided housing facility for the faculty members and the staff members at its campus, Faculty Quarter (FQ) and Staff Quarter (SQ).

=== Education hub ===
Several other universities and research institutions are either present or being established nearby, including AIIMS Bhubaneswar, NISER, IIIT, XIMB, one of the Indian government's proposed national universities of international calibre, and the Institute of Physics. NISER's campus is 2 km away from the IIT. Other institutions, such as Sri Sri University, premier law school National Law University Odisha, as well as the world's biggest academic institution, Vedanta University, will be in the neighbouring places of Cuttack and Puri respectively. IIT's location at Bhubaneswar, an emerging education hub, was promoted as an Information Technology Investment Region (ITIR) by the government. A total of 40 km^{2} of land was allocated for the purpose, out of which about 60% will be devoted to research and development. An estimated ₹780 crore (US$81 million) will be invested by the Indian government within the next few years in order to develop the institute.

=== Connectivity ===
The Old National Highway 5 (part of Golden Quadrilateral) is 8 km from this new IIT. Khurda Rd railway station is 4 km away from the campus, and the Biju Patnaik airport is 35 km away.

== Organization and administration ==
=== Governance ===
All IITs follow the same organization structure which has President of India as visitor at the top of the hierarchy. Directly under the president is the IIT Council. Under the IIT Council is the board of governors of each IIT. Under the board of governors is the director, who is the chief academic and executive officer of the IIT. Under the director, in the organizational structure, comes the deputy director. Under the director and the deputy director, come the deans, heads of departments, registrar.

=== Schools ===
The institute has adopted the concept of Schools rather than Departments for promoting inter-disciplinary research. At present the following Schools offer academic programmes:

- School of Basic Sciences (Physics, Chemistry, Bio Science & Mathematics)
- School of Humanities, Social Sciences and Management (Economics, English & Psychology)
- School of Mechanical Sciences (Mechanical Engineering)
- School of Infrastructure (Civil Engineering)
- School of Electrical and Computer Sciences (CSE, ECE & Electrical Engineering)
- School of Mineral, Metallurgical and Materials Engineering (Metallurgy & Material Engineering)
- School of Earth, Ocean and Climate Sciences (Geology, Atmospheric & Ocean Science)

=== Research Centres ===
- Virtual & Augmented Reality
- Design & Innovation
- Probiotics & Human Microbiome
- Material Science
- AI & Mechatronics
- Human-Computer Interface
- Quantum Chemistry
- Protein Biophysics
- Synthetic Organic Chemistry
- Coastal Observatory
- Chips 2 Startup
- Cyber Security
- AI & High Performance Computing

=== Structure ===
Structure of IITs

== Academics ==
The academic programmes of Institute include BTech (Hons.) in Computer Science, Civil, Electrical, ECE and Mechanical Engineering with an intake capacity of 50 each at the undergraduate level. BTech (Hons.) in Metallurgical and Materials Engineering is with intake capacity of 20. The institute also started Dual degree courses in Mechanical and Civil with intake of 10 from academic year 2016–17, which has been increased to 15 for Mechanical and 13 for Civil as of 2020–21. The Institute started the Doctoral programme from the academic session 2009–2010 and will offer admission to the joint MTech-PhD Programme from July 2012. The institute has broadly adopted the course curricula, syllabi and other academic regulations of IIT Kharagpur, the mentor institute.

=== Academic year ===
The academic year is divided into two semesters, a spring semester and an autumn semester. Between these two regular semesters, the academic year also includes a shorter summer quarter, during which some courses are offered. The institution follows the credit-based system of performance evaluation. The credits allocated to each course depends on the total number of contact hours, including lectures, tutorials and laboratory sessions. Each course is usually worth three credits. The typical course load per semester is 21–24 credits for undergraduate students.

=== Undergraduate programs ===
IIT Bhubaneswar offers undergraduate degrees in six technical disciplines and integrated five-year programs for undergraduate students leading to MTech degrees.

The BTech degree is based on a four-year program comprising eight semesters. The first year of the BTech curriculum has common courses from various departments. At the end of the first year, an option to change departments is given to meritorious students on the basis of their performance in the first two semesters. From the second year onwards, the students take courses offered exclusively by their departments that are known as "electives". In addition to these, the students takes inter-disciplinary courses known as "Lateral courses" and breadth courses for courses in humanities and social sciences, and management and information technology. During the 7th & 8th semester, undergraduate students undergo co-curricular practical training in Indian industry and undertake a Research project.

==== Admission ====
Admission to these programs is through the Joint Entrance Examination (JEE), taken by students seeking admission into the IITs after completing 12 years of schooling. As of 2016, the total undergraduate student intake every year is 260, with 40 students in each of the above-mentioned disciplines and 20 in Metallurgical and Materials Engineering.Each Dual degree courses has an intake of 10 students. The plan is to have 2,500 students within 3–4 years, which will expand to 10,000 students within 15 years.

=== Postgraduate programs ===
The MTech degree is based on a two-year program comprising four semesters. Research is included as a component in the MTech level.

Institute offers Joint MTech — PhD programs in all its schools except for the Schools of Basic Sciences and Humanities, Social Sciences & Management.

=== Doctorate programs ===
Institute has been admitting students into PhD programs since 2009.

=== Rankings ===
University rankings

General – international
- QS (World) (2022): 701–750
- Times (World) (2023): 1001–1200
- Times (Asia) (2022): 301-350
- Times (Emerging) (2022): 351-400

General – India
- NIRF (Overall) (2022): 65

Engineering – India
- NIRF (2022): 36
- India Today (2022): 11

IIT Bhubaneswar was ranked at 701–750 in the world by the QS World University Rankings 2022 list.

Among engineering colleges, IIT Bhubaneswar ranked 11 by India Today in 2022. It ranked 36 among engineering colleges by the National Institutional Ranking Framework (NIRF) in 2022

It was ranked 1001–1200 in the world by the Times Higher Education World University Rankings of 2023, 301-350 in Asia and 351-400 among Emerging Economies in 2022.

=== Library ===
The central library, which started functioning in January 2010, is a 300 square feet (28 m^{2}) room with a collection of 23000, text books. In addition, the mentor institute, IIT Kharagpur, provides IIT Bhubaneswar with access to its online resources such as e-databases, e-journals and abstract indexing services.

== Collaborations ==
=== Foreign ===
Sources:

- University of Quebec, Canada
- University of Waterloo, Canada
- York University, Canada
- Texas A&M University, US
- Warwick Manufacturing Group, UK
- University at Buffalo, US
- McGill University, Canada
- Shanghai Jiao Tong University, China
- University of Edinburg, UK
- University of Western Ontario, Canada
- University of North Texas, US
- University of Warwick, UK
- University of Massachusetts Dartmouth, US
- Washington University in St. Louis, US
- University of Southampton, UK
- National Oceanography Centre, UK
- University of Concepción, Chile
- Woods Hole Oceanographic Institution, US
- University of Surrey, UK
- University of Manchester, UK
- University of British Columbia, Canada
- Association for Overseas Technical Co-operation and Sustainable Partnership, Japan
- Plovdiv University "Paisii Hilendarski"
- Jahangirnagar University
- Bangladesh University of Engineering and Technology

=== National ===
- DRDO
- OPTCL
- AIIMS BBSR
- BHEL
- NALCO
- NMDC
- WHEEBOX
- NHAI
- MOES
- AICTE
- ISRO
- SDI BBSR
- Oil India Ltd
- ILS, Bhubaneswar

=== Research and Study ===
In April 2026, researchers from IIT Bhubaneswar and NIMHANS introduced a chaos-theory-based framework to analyze schizophrenia as a dynamical disease. Utilizing resting-state fMRI data, the team developed the U-KBBC chaotic system and a portable device named "Chinmoy." This method maps complex neural signals into visual mathematical attractors, providing personalized biological markers to track treatment efficacy and disease progression.

== Student life ==
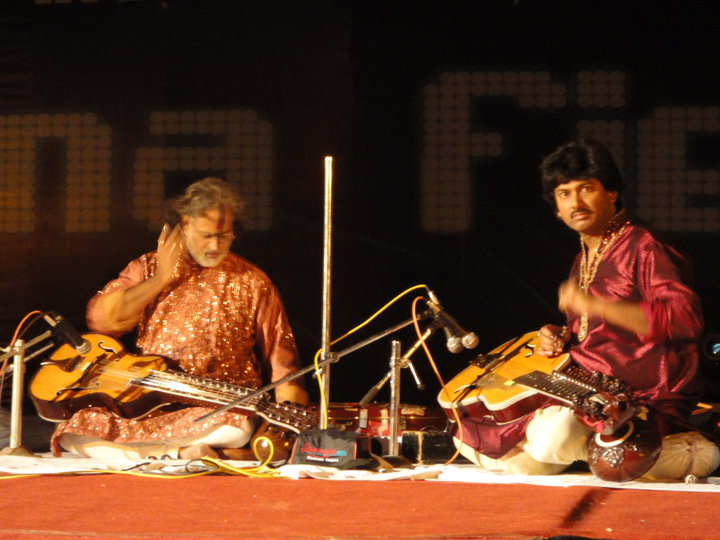
Vishwa Mohan Bhatt performing at Alma Fiesta 2010

=== Festivals ===
- Alma Fiesta: Alma Fiesta is the annual socio-cultural festival of Indian Institute of Technology, Bhubaneswar. It is a three-day festival. Usually launched during the mid weeks of January, Alma Fiesta offers a number of events that range from cultural performances like Odissi, Gotipua to clay modeling workshops, Euphony (War of rock bands), Spotlight (Stage play competition). The events organized also include modern dance forms like hip-hop, vocals, duets, karaoke, single minute extempore, spelling bee, pencil sketching as well as a youth marathon. Alma Fiesta also maintain a social drive named Prayatna.
- Wissenaire: Wissenaire is the annual techno-management festival of Indian Institute of Technology, Bhubaneswar which is held in its permanent campus located in Argul, Odisha. It is a three-day- long event usually held in the month of January every year. Wissenaire encompasses various sectors of technology, science and management. These include quizzing, coding, designing, robotics, planning and testing the creativity and innovative spirit of the young, intelligent minds.
- Entrepreneurship Summit: E-Summit, organized by the E-Cell hosts a number of panel discussions, workshops, competitions, and start-ups with the presence of personalities from industries, academia, and government.

=== Societies ===
The student societies are:

- Robotics and Intelligent Systems Club (R.I.S.C)
- FEBS - The Society of Finance, Economics and Business of IIT Bhubaneswar. The society deals with domain like Finance, Economics, Business, Product management, Consulting, Data Science and Machine Learning.
- Web Design Society. (WebnD)
- Astronomy Society.(Nakshatra)
- Programming Society. (Neuromancers)
- Dance Society.(D-Groovers)
- Dramatics Society. (The Fourth Wall)
- Entrepreneurship Cell.(E-Cell)
- Film Making Society. (Cinewave)
- Fine Arts Society. (Kalakriti)
- Literary Societies. (Panacea, Abhivyakti)
- Music Society.(Aaroh)
- Photography Society. (Clix)
- Social Welfare Society. (Souls for Solace)
- Quizzing Society. (Quiz Society)

=== Startup Incubation ===
The Department of Science & Technology and the Ministry of Human Resource Development, Government of India sanctioned Rs.1.50 Crore for establishing a Startup Centre at IIT Bhubaneswar. The then Director of IIT Bhubaneswar inaugurated the center on 20 June 2016. The Startup Centre is envisioned to have enrollment minimum of 10 startups in the 1st year of its commencement. This facility is going to be made available to all budding entrepreneurs of the region. Additionally, the Institute established an in-house technology incubator, as a part of well-thought-of incubation-cum-entrepreneurial eco-system with the objective of encouraging students to take up entrepreneurship. This facility would be made available to the outgoing students and to the faculty of the institute. In 2017, the institute received license and incorporation certificate from Registrar of companies to run IIT Bhubaneswar Research and Entrepreneurship Park, a not for profit company which will act as a nodal center for promoting entrepreneurship, research, and startup activities.

=== Dance as a B tech Subject ===
In 2015, IIT Bhubaneswar introduced Odissi dance as a BTech subject becoming the first IIT in the country to introduce any dance form in its curriculum. Noted Odissi exponents Kum Kum Mohanty, Iliana Citaristi along with other experts in the field have been roped in to design the curriculum and the exam pattern for the course. Any student who continues it until the final year will get a diploma in dance as well.

== See also ==
- Indian Institutes of Technology (IITs)
- National Institutes of Technology (NITs)
