= Wissenaire =

- Genre: Techno-Management Fest
- Locations: Indian Institute of Technology, Bhubaneswar, India
- Founded: 2010
- Major events: Robowars, Kick Off, Plan De Negocious, Intrigue, Green Venture, Colloquia, etc.
- Filing status: Student Run, Non-Profit Organization
- Sponsor: Indian Institute of Technology Bhubaneswar
- Website: www.wissenaire.org

Wissenaire is the annual techno-management festival of Indian Institute of Technology Bhubaneswar held in the Arugul, permanent campus of IIT Bhubaneswar. It is a three-day-long event usually held during the third week of January every year. The word Wissenaire is derived from the German word 'Wissen' meaning knowledge and 'aire' meaning free. Wissenaire encompasses various sectors of technology, science and management. These include quizzing, coding, designing, robotics, planning and testing the creativity and innovative spirit of the young technical minds.

== History ==
Novus is regarded as the first technical fest by IIT Bhubaneswar. But it remained an intra-college event. Later in 2011, technical enthusiasts of IIT Bhubaneswar conducted the maiden edition of its techfest and named it Wissenaire. The maiden edition received an enormous response from across the country. Wissenaire had an overwhelming participation from various parts of the country like Kerala, Tamil Nadu, West Bengal, Uttar Pradesh and Andhra Pradesh as well as home state Orissa. The fest is also associated with Solid works, Microsoft, Dell and IBM.

== Workshops ==
Wissenaire brings out the live experience of latest technology and its practical applications through its workshops. Attracting many technical enthusiasts, the fest included workshops by international companies such as Microsoft, Dell, Mechahawks, Archipidia, Ablabs solutions, ETRIX technologies, BATOI, Robo Edutech India, IBM and National Instruments.

== Knights Incite ==
Knights Incite is the guest lecture series of Wissenaire. Stalwarts of different sectors of technology, academia, management and research deliver the prestigious Knight's Incite lecture about their area of expertise. Mission of Knight's Incite is to provide a chance for young mind to interact with the elites of the technological and corporate world.

== Previous editions ==
=== 2013 ===
In 2013, Wissenaire has witnessed visits by luminaries like social activist Kiran Bedi, Dutch Magician and Mentalist Arvind Jayashankar and SK Roongta, former SAIL chairman. Wissenaire also brought the first ever 3D laser show to Bhubaneswar which was held in Janta Maidan. Wissenaire has also witnessed workshops by international software giants like Microsoft, Dell and IBM. DRDO has been a regular participant in Wissenaire displaying their might.

=== 2015 ===
In 2015, Wissenaire has witnessed visits by renowned personalities like Pakistani pop singer Falak Shabir, the Great Indian Manager of Dabbawala Dr. Pawan Agrawal, mentalist from Israel Roy Zaltsman, the author of the best selling book 'I too had a love story' Ravinder Singh, Varun Agrawal Indian first-generation entrepreneur, guinness world record holder for largest human beat box Vineeth Vincent. Wissenaire also brought semifinalists of India's Got Talent Season 5 Shadow Art, 3D Mapping as part of Magna Vista.
