= Progressive Brothers =

Indian musical duo

- Origin: New Delhi, India
- Genres: Progressive house; electro house
- Years active: 2011–present
- Label: Black Hole Recordings
- Members: Sunny Sharma; Karan Bhalla
- Website: progressivebrothers.com

Progressive Brothers is an Indian electronic music duo band from New Delhi. The band consists of Sunny Sharma and Karan Bhalla, who are djs and songwriters. Progressive Brothers have played at India's biggest electronic music festivals like Sunburn, VH1 Supersonic and Enchanted Valley Carnival. They have also performed at numerous events and college festivals across India.

== History ==
The band was formed in 2012 by Sunny & Karan. Initially, Dj Karan was working for a multinational insurance company and Sunny was a banker. They eventually decided to pursue their career in music as "The Progressive Brothers". Their debut track "Veda" was in collaboration with Richard Durand.

They have shared the stage alongside David Guetta, Tiesto, Martin Garrix, Dmitri Vegas & Like Mike Dyro, KSHMR, Kygo, Oliver Heldens, R3HAB, Carnage, Steve Aoki, Benny Benassi, Dada Life, Seven Lions etc.

They were named India’s Best Trance Djs for 2012 – 2013 by Myfavdj Awards.

== Discography ==
Song	Album
Richard Durand feat. Progressive Brothers - Veda	Richard Durand vs. The World Collab Mix
#IndiaIndia Feat. MC Haits	-
Skin & Bones	Progressive Brothers Remix
Moonbeam Feat. Polina Griffith – I Go On	Progressive Brothers Remix
