= E. Balagurusamy =

Indian academic

- Ellappa Balagurusamy
- Born: 16 October 1945 (age 80); Karur, Tamil Nadu, India
- Education: IIT Roorkee
- Known for: Programming in ANSI C Object Oriented Programing in C++

Ellappa Balagurusamy is an Indian educator, engineer. He is the Chairman of EBG Foundation in Coimbatore and the President of the Coimbatore Academy of Sciences.

== Career ==
Balagurusamy served as a Member, Planning Commission of the Tamil Nadu Government July 2011.

From December 2006 to May 2010, Balagurusamy was an appointed Member of the Union Public Service Commission, a Constitutional Body established under the Article 315 of the Constitution of India for rendering advice to Government of India on matters related to recruitment, promotion, and disciplinary cases related to different central civil services. In 2004 he was Vice-Chancellor of Anna University, Chennai.

He visited Nellore in 2010 to attend Swanrabharat trust's event accompanied by Shri Venkaiah Naidu. Balagurusamy holds an ME (Hons) in electrical engineering, Ph.D. in systems engineering, both from IIT Roorkee, and a Diploma in education from U.K.

As an educator, he aired his concerns on the inconsistencies and anomalies observed in the implementation of reservation and social justice policies in Tamil news channel (Thanthi TV) debate. He wrote and gave interviews in leading dailies highlighting the benefits of NEET policy with facts and careful thought. He also pointed out data fallacies, flaws in opinion construction, the lack of thoroughness and hastiness observed in the Justice AK Rajan Committee Report of Tamil Nadu government against the NEET policy which portrays NEET to be biased against Linguistic priorities, disfavor the socially-disadvantaged and students from poor and Rural background.

== Selected books ==
1. Object Oriented Programming with C++
2. Programming with ANSI C With V-Labs
3. dBase III+: A Guide and Workbook
4. Programming With Java
5. Programming in C# - A Primer
