= Cognizance =

Cognizance may refer to:

- Cognizance, IIT Roorkee, an annual technical festival held at the Indian Institute of Technology Roorkee.
- Cognizance, a heraldic badge, emblem, or device formerly worn by retainers of a royal or noble house
- In law, cognizance is the action of taking judicial notice, satisfaction to court from the available materials as to the existence of prima facie to proceed further for any enquiry or trial
- Church of Cognizance, a church founded in 1991
- Cognizance (band), a British Technical death metal band

== See also ==
- Cognizant, an American multinational corporation
