= CTSH (disambiguation) =

CTSH is the ticker symbol of Cognizant.

CTSH may also refer to

- CTSH (gene), a human gene which encodes the protein Cathepsin H

== See also ==
- Cognizance (disambiguation)
