= Mukat lal Sharma =

Indian earthquake engineer and seismologist

Mukat Lal Sharma

Academic background
- Education: B.Sc., Meerut University; M.Tech. and Ph.D., University of Roorkee

Academic work
- Discipline: Earthquake engineering
- Institutions: Indian Institute of Technology Roorkee
- Main interests: Engineering seismology, seismic hazard analysis, earthquake early-warning systems

Mukat Lal Sharma is an Indian earthquake engineer and seismologist who is a professor in the Department of Earthquake Engineering at the Indian Institute of Technology Roorkee (IIT Roorkee). He has also headed the institute's International Centre of Excellence for Dams since May 2024.

== Education and career ==
Sharma received a Bachelor of Science degree from Meerut University in 1982, a Master of Technology degree in applied geophysics from the University of Roorkee in 1985, and a PhD in earthquake engineering from the University of Roorkee in 1992.

He joined the Department of Earthquake Engineering at the University of Roorkee as a scientist in 1985. He subsequently held academic appointments at the University of Roorkee and IIT Roorkee, becoming a professor in 2008 and holding the Professor HAG position from January 2018.

== Research ==
Sharma's research areas include engineering seismology, seismotectonics, seismic hazard analysis, satellite radar interferometry and strong ground-motion prediction.

In September 2017, the Press Trust of India reported in Hindustan Times that Sharma was the principal investigator of IIT Roorkee's earthquake early-warning pilot in Uttarakhand. The report described the deployment of 84 sensors in the Garhwal Himalayas and plans at the time to expand the warning system.

In a 2020 interview with Careers360, Sharma discussed earthquake risk in the Delhi–National Capital Region, earthquake-resistant construction, retrofitting and public preparedness.

== Recognition ==
Sharma received the National Geoscience Award 2024 in the category of natural-hazard investigations. The award was presented by the President of India on 26 September 2025.

The Ministry of Mines' award citation describes his work on seismic hazard mapping for dams, satellite radar interferometry and earthquake early-warning systems.
