= Cognizance, IIT Roorkee =

Annual technical festival in India

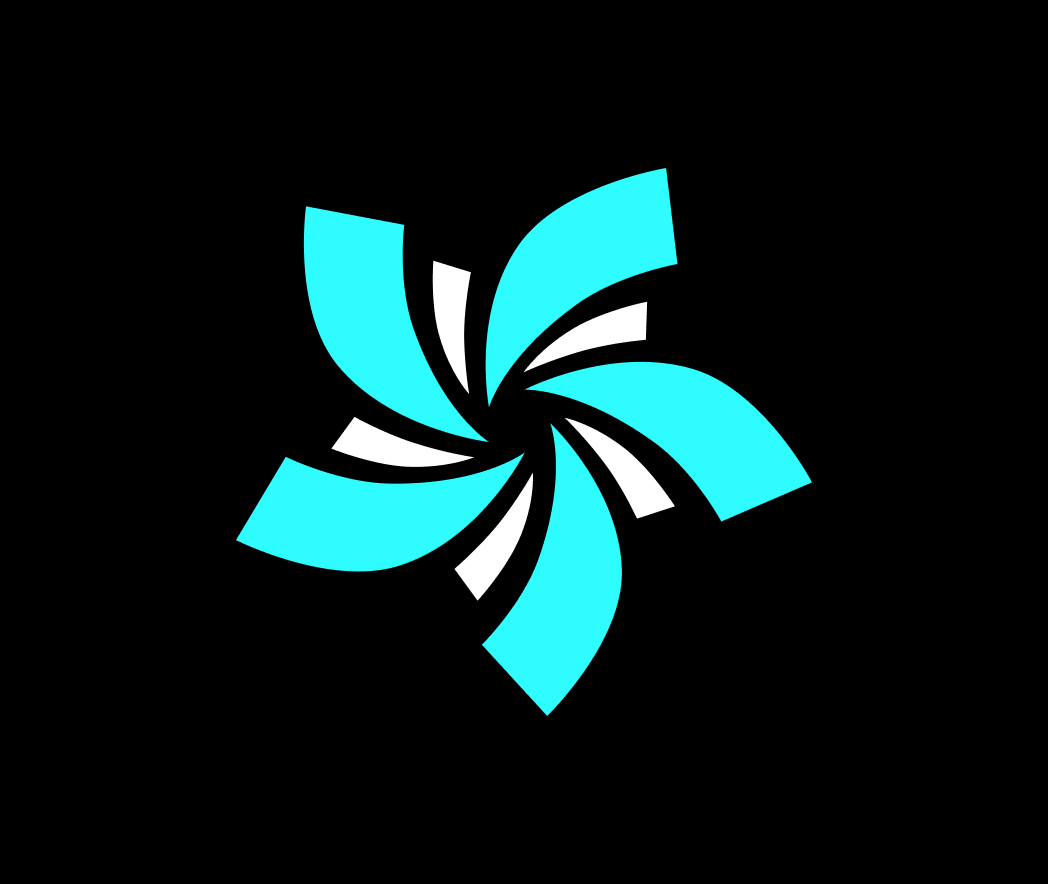
- Logo of Cognizance 2026
- Status: Active
- Genre: Non-Profit Student Organization
- Dates: 13 - 15 March, 2026
- Frequency: Annually
- Venue: IIT Roorkee
- Locations: Roorkee, Uttarakhand
- Coordinates: 29°51′52″N 77°53′47″E
- Country: India
- Years active: 23 years
- Established: 2003
- Patrons: UNESCO, UNDP, UNEP, Digital India, Centre for Environment Education (CEE), Make in India, South Asia Youth Environment Network (SAYEN)
- Organiser: Student Community of IIT Roorkee
- Website: https://www.cognizance.org.in/

Cognizance is the annual technical festival of the Indian Institute of Technology Roorkee, Asia's oldest and one of India's most premier technical institutions. Established in 2003, Cognizance has grown to become Asia's second largest student-run technical festival, attracting students, professionals, and enthusiasts from across the globe.

Held over three days in March, the festival features a diverse array of over 200 events, including technical competitions, workshops, exhibitions, guest lectures, and cultural performances.

== History and growth ==
Cognizance started in 2003 as a part of the Hobbies Club of IIT Roorkee. Initial versions of Cognizance witnessed the participation of over 1000 students from more than 100 colleges.

Cognizance 2005 saw the inauguration with the chief guest Arun Seth, chairman, British Telecom Ltd. (India and SAARC) and had A. K. Sinha, chairman and managing director, BSNL, was the chief guest for the valedictory function. The guest of honor was Ravi Sharma, managing director, Alcatel, India. Events like Encuesta - the online quiz drew participation from other countries as well. Companies like BSNL, TATA Motors, CISCO Systems, and Ericsson showed interest in the institute's activities by sponsoring the festival.

Cognizance 2008 invited Rajiv Kumar, General Manager for business and office team MSIDC, Padmabhushan "Late Dr. Yash Pal", India's well-known scientist, Mr. Sean Blagsvedt, CEO of Babajob.com, Mr. Manish Tripathi, Director of Mumbai Dabbawala, and Dr. H. C. Verma, the well-known physicist as guest speakers. It had SuperUber, a Brazilian interactive media company, which created a wall where people interacted with their shadows. The title sponsor was Reliance Industries Limited. The fest was co-sponsored by Microsoft IDC. Wipro sponsored Mechasoft, a programming challenge.

Cognizance 2009 was based on the theme ‘Think Energy, Go Green’ and was attended by many students from renowned foreign technical institutes, including the University of Cincinnati, Ohio State University (US), Technical University of Crete, Greece, Faculty of Architecture, University of Porto, Portugal, RIBA North-west Liverpool (UK). Dr. Chandra M Kintala, director of Yahoo! Labs (India) inaugurated the fest and top-class experts delivered guest lectures during the fest. These experts include Dr. Sylvester J Gates, a physicist from University of Maryland, USA, Dr. John C Mather, Noble Laureate Physics, 2006 (via video conferencing), Dr. MC Mehta, environmentalist (Magsaysay Awardee), Dr. John R Ockendon, Director, Oxford Centre for Collaborative Applied Mathematics and BL Chawla, father of Lt. Kalpana Chawla among many others.

Cognizance 2010 had participation of around 3500 students from over 900 technical and management colleges across the nation. It was dubbed as the Dream Cognizance, becoming one of the largest technical festivals of North India. The festival also hosted many students from renowned foreign technical institutes, including the University of Cincinnati, Ohio State University.

Cognizance 2011 recorded a participation of over 2500 students for 160 events, which included centre stage events, departmental events, workshops, exhibitions, and guest lectures, which were based on the theme "For a Better Tomorrow". This edition was also ISO 9001:2008 certified. The website of Cognizance saw 10 Million hits from 107 countries.

Cognizance 2012 had a participation of more than 3000 students for over 180 events. That year Cognizance started Student Partner Programme (SPP), which aimed to make student ambassadors in different colleges. Cognizance made SPPs in over 150 colleges.

Cognizance 2013 was based on the theme "Aim Conclusion" and was attended by over 3000 students of various colleges from India. The confluence hosted more than 180 events which included center stage, departmental events, workshops, exhibitions, and guest lectures. The title sponsor was CAIRN.

Cognizance 2014 was organized on the theme "Engineering Change" and was attended by over 3000 students. The 12th version was an assemblage of more than 150 events. The 12th version also witnessed more than 12 million hits on its website.

Cognizance 2015 was the 13th edition and witnessed an attendance of more than 3500 students from all over the country who came to attend an assemblage of more than 180 events.

Cognizance 2016 It was for the first time that the country's defence minister inaugurated the IIT festival. Defence Minister Manohar Parrikar's arrival on the campus to inaugurate the fest on 18 March was the highlight of the event.

Cognizance 2017 was based on the theme "Eureka 2.0" and recorded an attendance of over 2700 students from all over the continent. There were more than 200 events which included 12 workshops, 8 guest lectures, 2 panel discussions, and 9 exhibitions.

Cognizance 2018 was attended by over 3500 students. The confluence hosted more than 200 events that consisted of 13 workshops and 9 exhibitions which were all based on the theme "dreaming Discoveries".

Cognizance 2019 was the latest version and was the second largest technical festival in Asia. The fest witnessed an attendance of over 2500 students from various colleges of Asia. With the participation of 22 departments of IIT Roorkee, the organizing team hosted over 200 events that consisted of 15 workshops, 4 guest lectures, and 3 panel discussions.

Apart from all this Cognizance has hosted many edutainment nights in which many of the prominent performers have performed. A few of them are KK, Papon, Coke Studio, Zakir Khan, Biswa Kalyan Rath, Sachin–Jigar, AronChupa, Diego Miranda, Guru Randhawa, Eluveitie, Mohit Chauhan, Harsh Gujaral, Amit Trivedi and many more.

== Patronages and recognitions ==
Over the 22 years of its growth, Cognizance has received associations from various recognized campaigns and banners. The most remarkable ones being "UNESCO" (for the ‘Empowering Uttrakhand’ initiative in the 2020 edition), "UNDP" (for ‘TBT Productathon’ in 2019 edition), "UREDA" (for the ‘Let’s Eliminate Darkness’ initiative of the edition 2018), "Digital India Campaign" (The Digital India Initiative in 2016 Cognizance was undertaken under the Digital India initiative by the Ministry of Communications and IT). More associations include "UNEP", "International Year of Pulses", "Centre for Environment Education (CEE)", "SAYEN", "Startup India", and "Make in India".
