= Paper Technology =

Technical publications

Paper Technology is the official journal of the Paper Industry Technical Association and is a technical publication for the paper industry and its allied trades. It was started in 1960. The headquarters of the journal is in London.
