= Chandra Kintala =

Computer scientist

Chandra Kintala (1948–2009) was a computer science researcher in New Jersey, United States, and Bangalore, India, from 2006 to 2009.

He worked at Bell Labs in AT&T, Lucent and Avaya in New Jersey, where he and David Belanger invented a language and a software tool used in AT&T for data analytics on very large databases. With Huang Yen-nun, he worked on Software-implemented Fault Tolerance and Software Rejuvenation in the 1990s. He also worked in distributed systems and network software research at Bell Labs.

While working at Bell Labs, he held the titles of adjunct professor and later distinguished industry professor at Stevens Institute of Technology in New Jersey.

== India ==
In September 2006, he moved to India as the Director of Motorola Labs in Bangalore. In August 2008, he joined Yahoo! Labs in Bangalore where he held the position of the Director of System Sciences and Academic Relations in India.

== Education ==
Kintala had a Ph.D. in Computer Science from Penn State University, an M. Tech. from Indian Institute of Technology, Kanpur, and a B.Tech. from National Institute of Technology, Rourkela, India. He had published 48 refereed research papers and received 6 US patents and a Smithsonian medal sponsored by Computer World in 1998.

== Conferences and memberships ==
He had been active at academic and industry conferences and associations:

- General Chair of IEEE's conference on Dependable Systems and Networks in Philadelphia in June 2006
- Acting Chair of IFIP WG1.2
- Member of IFIP WG10.4
- Senior member of IEEE
- Keynote or guest speaker at several academic and industry events
- Member of several technical program committees
- Member of FICCI and Pacific Council's Joint Task Force on Global Innovation Economy – Enhancing India-US Relations.

== Death ==
Kintala had a heart attack and died on 5 November 2009 at Summit, New Jersey. He is survived by his wife Bharti and his two children.
