= IIT Roorkee =

Research Institute in Roorkee, Uttarakhand, India

Indian Institute of Technology Roorkee
- Former names: College of Civil Engineering at Roorkee (1847–1854); Thomason College of Civil Engineering (1854–1947); University of Roorkee (1947–2001)
- Motto: Śramaṃ vinā na kimapi sādhyam(Sanskrit)
- Motto in English: Nothing can be achieved without hard work
- Type: Public technical university
- Established: 1847; 179 years ago
- Chairman: B. V. R. Mohan Reddy
- Director: Kamal Kishore Pant
- Academic staff: 585
- Students: 9,735
- Undergraduates: 4,498
- Postgraduates: 2,360
- Doctoral students: 2,877
- Location: Roorkee, Uttarakhand, India; 29°51′52″N 77°53′47″E
- Campus: Urban 365 acres (1.48 km^{2})
- Language: English, Hindi
- Website: www.iitr.ac.in

Indian Institute of Technology Roorkee (IIT Roorkee or IITR) is a technical university located in Roorkee, Uttarakhand, India. It is the 2nd oldest engineering institution in India, after College of Engineering, Guindy (1794). It was founded as the College of Civil Engineering in 1847 during East India Company rule in India by James Thomason, the Lieutenant-Governor of the North-Western Provinces in which Roorkee was located; its purpose was to train officers and surveyors employed in the construction of the Ganges Canal. In 1854, after the completion of the canal and Thomason's death, it was renamed the Thomason College of Civil Engineering by Proby Cautley, the designer and projector of the canal. It was renamed University of Roorkee in 1949, and again renamed IIT Roorkee in 2001. The institution has 22 academic departments covering Engineering, Applied Sciences, Humanities & Social Sciences and Management programs with an emphasis on scientific and technological education and research.

== History ==
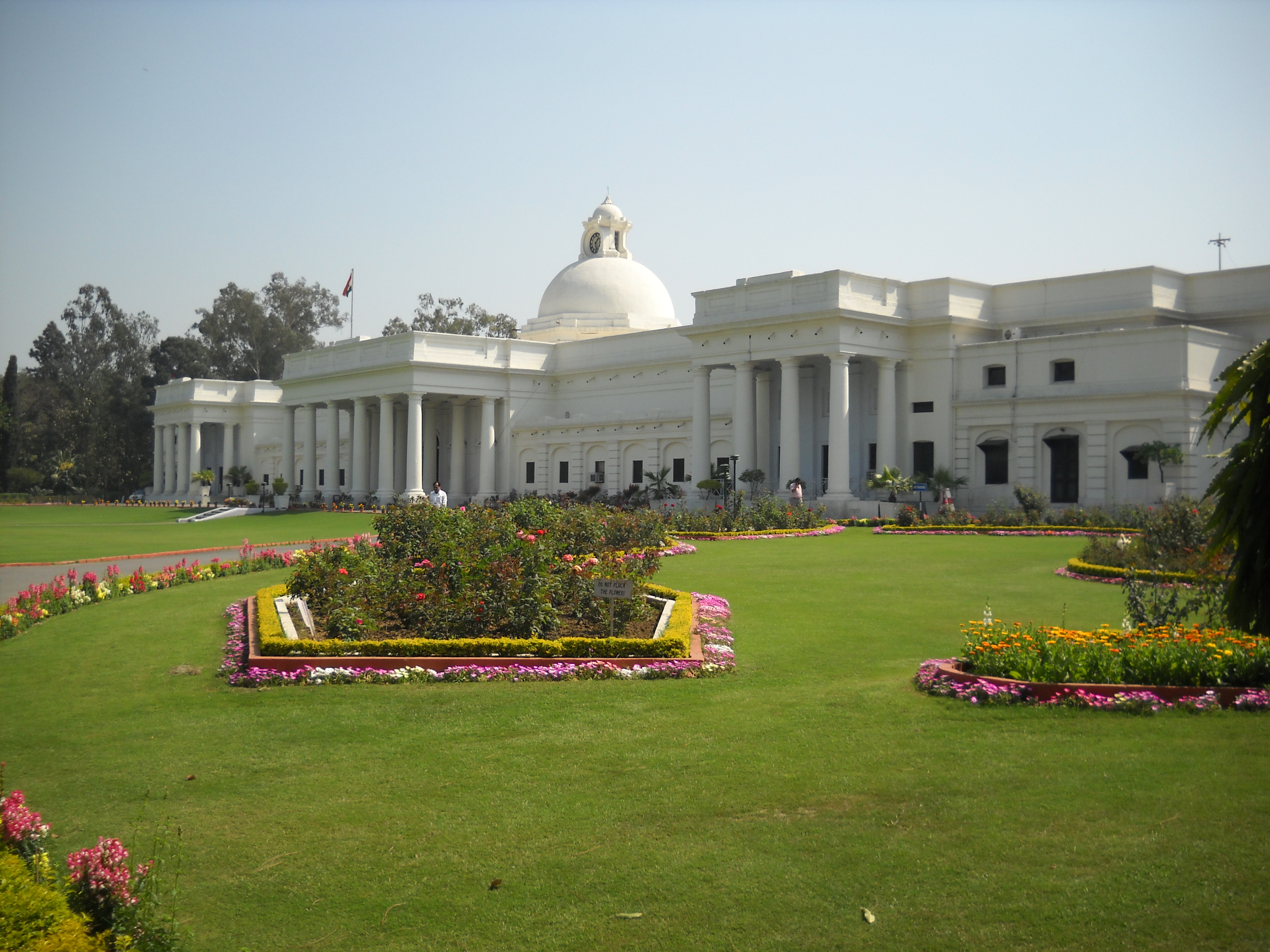
The Thomason College of Engineering was founded in 1847 to help train engineers for the construction of the Ganges Canal. The Canal Engineer's Bungalow lies within the campus of IIT Roorkee.

The institution was founded in 1847 by James Thomason, the Lieutenant-Governor of the North-Western Provinces (in which Roorkee then lay) to aid engineers and surveyors at work in the construction of the Ganges Canal. It offered instruction catered to a variety of students; this included an engineering class for the domiciled British and some Indians; an upper subordinates class for British noncommissioned officers; and a lower subordinates class for Indian surveyors. By the mid-1880s, "the school has a hundred students, substantial buildings, and a reputation as an important center for the study of hydraulic engineering."

During its early decades, the college maintained a close structural relationship with the military. Administrative and senior teaching posts at the institution were frequently overseen by officers seconded from the Royal Engineers and the Indian Army's sapper corps.

An Electrical Engineering department was added in 1897. The architecture department instituted a master's degree course in Architecture (M. Arch.) in 1969–70.

In 1978, the Institute of Paper Technology, Saharanpur was merged with the then University of Roorkee. The Institute of Paper Technology was established as School of Paper Technology by the Government of India in 1964, with an aid from the Royal Swedish Government. The school was renamed as the Institute of Paper Technology in July 1968 and subsequently Department of Paper Technology in July 1992.

The first edition of Thomso, the institute's annual cultural festival was held in 1982. In 1997 the government of India released a stamp dedicated to 150th anniversary of university of Roorkee.

On 21 September 2001, an ordinance issued by the Government of India declared it as the nation's seventh Indian Institute of Technology, renaming it to the current name, Indian Institute of Technology Roorkee. The ordinance was converted into an act by the Parliament to make IIT Roorkee an "Institution of National Importance".

To mark the institute's 175th anniversary in 2022, the central government issued a Rs 175 coin as a gesture of commemoration.

== Campus ==
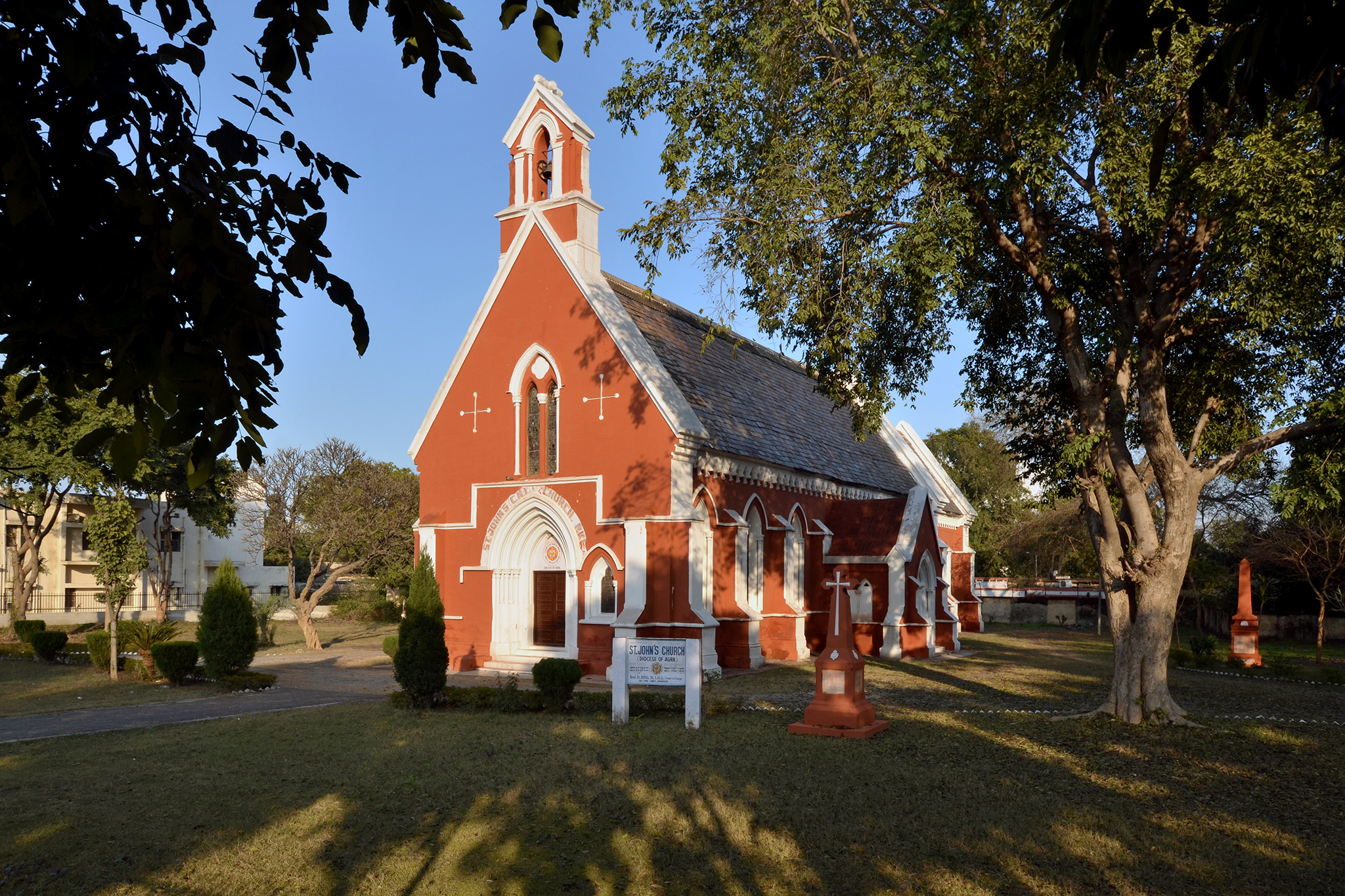
St. John's Church, Roorkee Campus

The main campus in Roorkee has an area of 365 acres (1,480,000 m^{2}).

IIT Roorkee has a separate campus of 25 acres (100,000 m^{2}) in Saharanpur which offers courses in Polymer Science, Process Engineering, Paper Technology & Packaging Technology, Applied Mathematics and Scientific Computing. In addition to this, a new ten-acre campus has been established in Greater Noida, Knowledge Park II, which was inaugurated on 4 April 2011. The Noida extension centre has 16 lecture rooms, software laboratories, faculty offices, a library and a computer center.

Most students live in the hostels, where extracurricular activities complement the academic routine. The campus has 16 hostels, of which two (Sarojini, Kasturba) are occupied by girls. The campus has a co-ed hostel, New Vigyan Kunj (NHVK). and a hostel for female students, the Himalaya Bhawan. Hostels may accommodate undergraduate and graduate students along with doctoral students. Students are assigned to hostels by the school administration after their freshmen year. There are nine hostels for married students, doctoral students and foreign students. Each bhawan has a mess. Mess administration consists of a staff advisor, a chief advisor, and a student mess secretary.

== Organization and administration ==
=== Governance ===
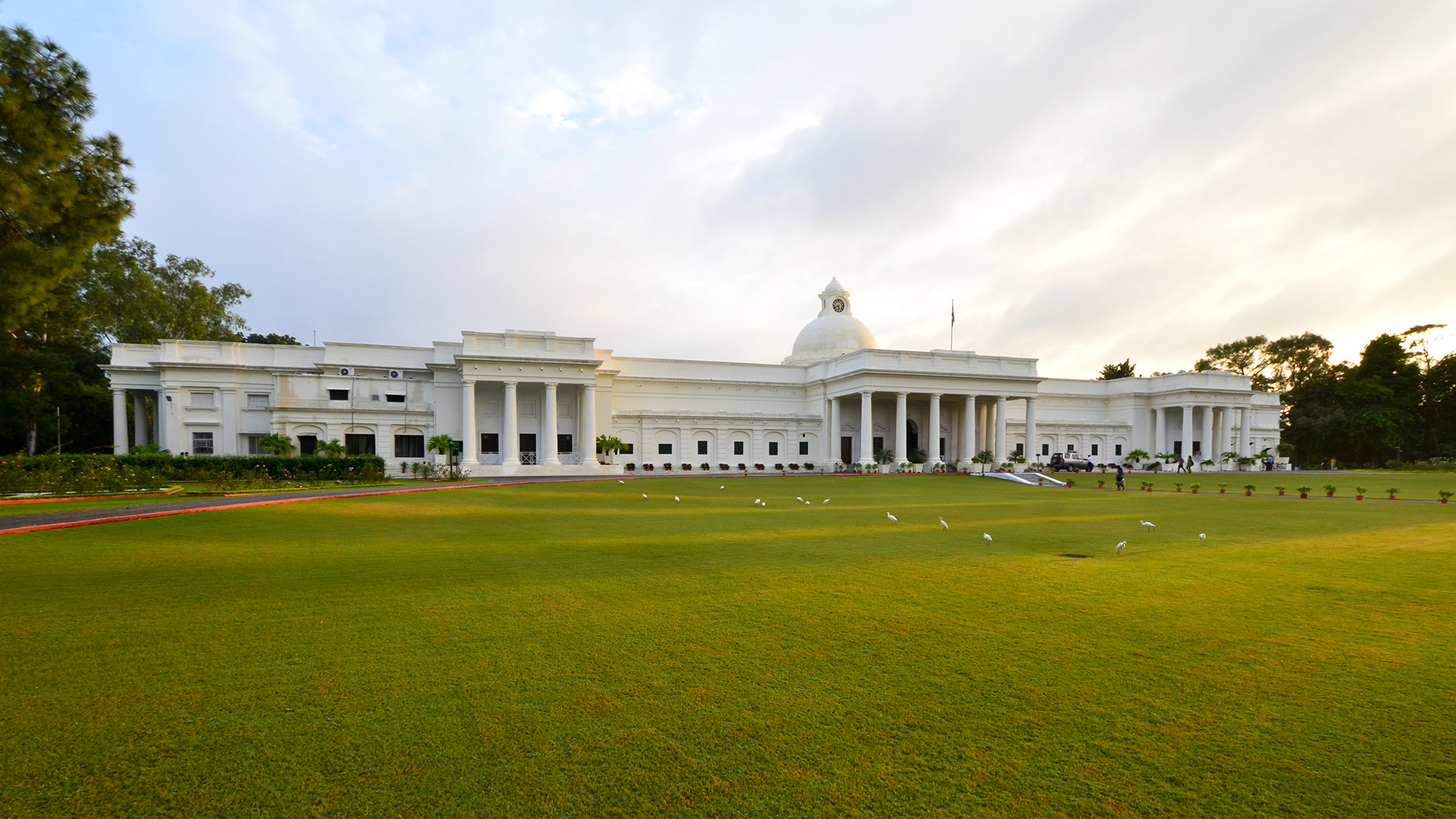
View of IIT Roorkee Admin Building.

All IITs follow the same organization structure which has President of India as visitor at the top of the hierarchy. Directly under the president is the IIT Council. Under the IIT Council is the board of governors of each IIT. Under the board of governors is the director, who is the chief academic and executive officer of the IIT. Under the director, in the organizational structure, comes the deputy director. Under the director and the deputy director, come the deans, heads of departments, registrar.

=== Departments and Centers ===
IIT Roorkee has the largest number of academic units in the country. It has 23 academic departments covering engineering, applied sciences, humanities & social sciences, and management programmes; 9 academic centers; 3 centers of excellence; 7 academic service centers; and 7 supporting units.

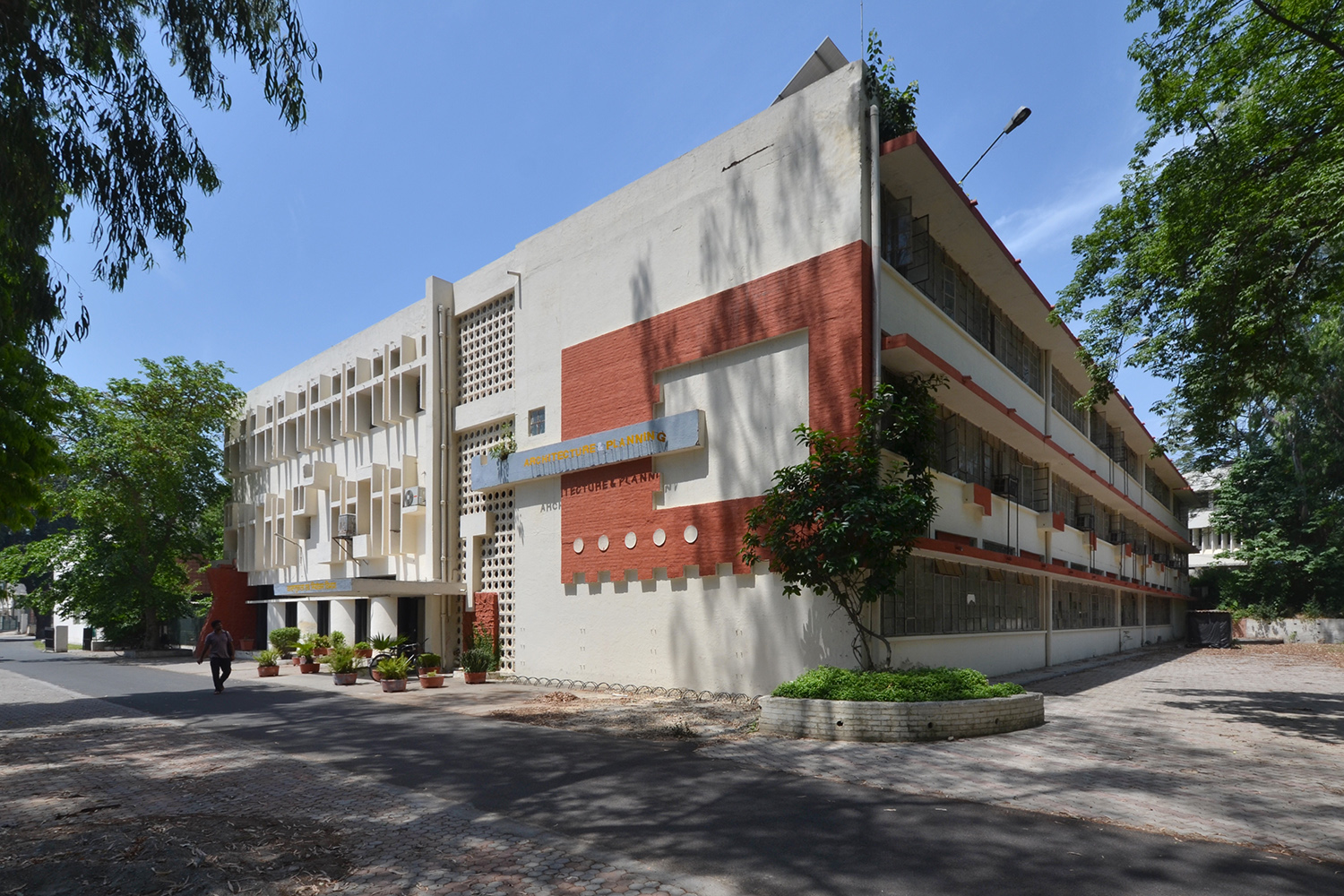
Department of Architecture & Planning

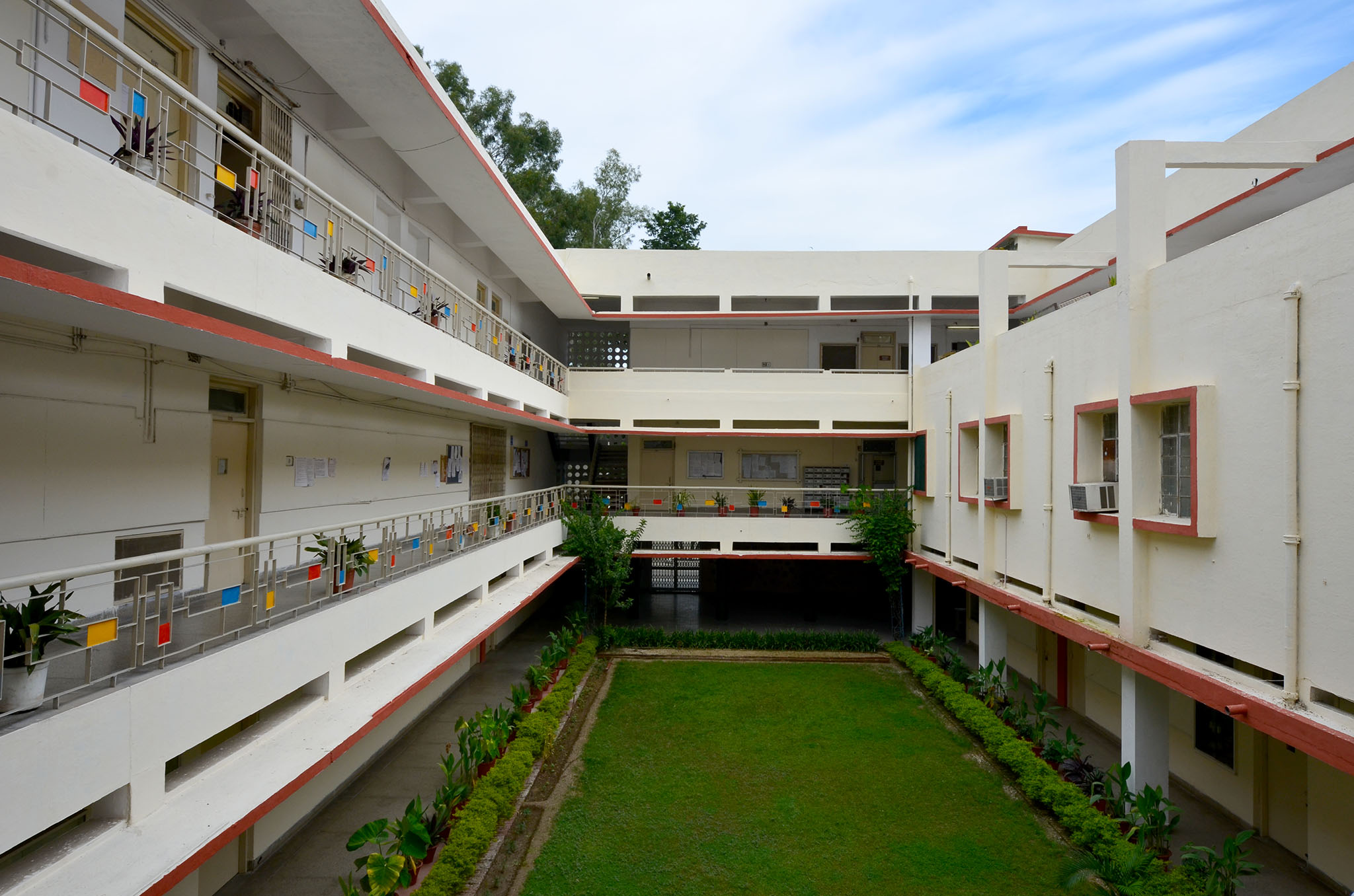
Inner courtyard of Department of Architecture & Planning

- Departments
  - Engineering and Applied Sciences
    - Architecture and Planning
    - Applied Science and Engineering
    - Biosciences and Bioengineering
    - Chemical Engineering
    - Chemistry
    - Civil Engineering
    - Computer Science and Engineering
    - Data Science and Artificial Intelligence
    - Earthquake Engineering
    - Earth Sciences
    - Electrical Engineering
    - Electronics and Communication Engineering
    - Humanities and Social Sciences
    - Hydrology
    - Hydro and Renewable Energy
    - Management Studies
    - Mathematics
    - Mechanical and Industrial Engineering
    - Metallurgical and Materials Engineering
    - Paper Technology
    - Polymer and Process Engineering
    - Physics
    - Water Resources Development and Management
  - Sciences
    - Physics
    - Chemistry
    - Mathematics
  - Business
    - Management Studies
  - Humanities
    - Humanities and Social Sciences

Computer Centre

- Centers
  - Centre of Excellence
    - Centre of Nanotechnology
    - Centre for Transportation Systems (CTRANS)
    - Centre of Excellence in Disaster Mitigation & Management (CoEDMM)
  - Academic Service centers
    - Mahatma Gandhi Central Library
    - Centre of Nanotechnology
    - Centre for Transportation Systems
    - Centre of Excellence in Disaster Mitigation & Management
    - Continuing Education Centre
    - Institute Computer Centre
    - Institute Instrumentation Centre
    - Intellectual Property Rights Cell
    - Quality Improvement Programme
  - Supporting Service Centers
    - Educational Technology Cell
    - Institute Hospital

== Academics ==
IIT Roorkee offers academic programmes in Engineering, Technology, Applied Sciences, and Management. It has eleven undergraduate (UG), one integrated dual degree, sixty one postgraduate (PG) and several doctoral programmes.

The institute admits students to B.Tech., B.Arch. and integrated M.Sc. integrated M.Tech courses through the Joint Entrance Examination (JEE) conducted at centers all over India. Before being converted into an IIT, the university selected students through the Roorkee Entrance Exam (REE) conducted on an All-India level. The selectivity of REE was close to 0.25%. After IIT-JEE, it was considered to be the second toughest engineering entrance examination in India. Admission to PG programmes in engineering and architecture is on the basis of GATE score and/or a written test and interview. For PG programmes in fundamental sciences, admission is based on the Joint Admission Test (JAM).

Along with the engineering courses, the institute offers a two-year residential MBA program for which the admissions, starting from 2011, will be done on the basis of Common Admission Test, thus replacing Joint Management Entrance Test (JMET) previously conducted by the IITs. The institute also offered an interdisciplinary program in computer applications leading to a degree in Master of computer applications (MCA). The MCA program was a three-year course and admission for the course was through JAM. This programme has been discontinued.

According to statistics published by institute in 2007–08, 4137 students were enrolled in the institute across all programs. The student-to-academic-staff ratio was 2.6:1 and that of UG/PG students was 1.4:1.

=== Rankings ===
University and college rankings

General – international
- ARWU (2022): 701-800
- QS (World) (2025): 335

General – India
- NIRF (Overall) (2024): 8
- NIRF (Research) (2024): 9

Engineering – India
- NIRF (2024): 6

Business/Management – India
- NIRF (2024): 18

Architecture – India
- NIRF (2024): 1

Internationally, IIT Roorkee was ranked 369 in the QS World University Rankings 2023 and 114 in Asia, and is ranked 335 in the 2025 edition. It was ranked 701–800 in the Academic Ranking of World Universities of 2022.

IIT Roorkee ranked first with a score of 84.92 among the Indian Architecture colleges, according to NIRF 2024. It ranked sixth among engineering colleges with a score of 76.00 by the National Institutional Ranking Framework in 2024 and eighth overall with a score of 71.52.

University and college rankings

General – international
- ARWU (2022): 701-800
- QS (World) (2023): 369
- QS (Asia) (2023): 114

General – India
- NIRF (Overall) (2022): 7
- NIRF (Research) (2022): 8

Engineering – India
- NIRF (2022): 6
- NIRF (2023): 5

Business/Management – India
- NIRF (2022): 19

Architecture – India
- NIRF (2022): 1

The Department of Management Studies ranked 18th with a score of 61.21 among management schools in India by the National Institutional Ranking Framework in 2024.

=== Library ===
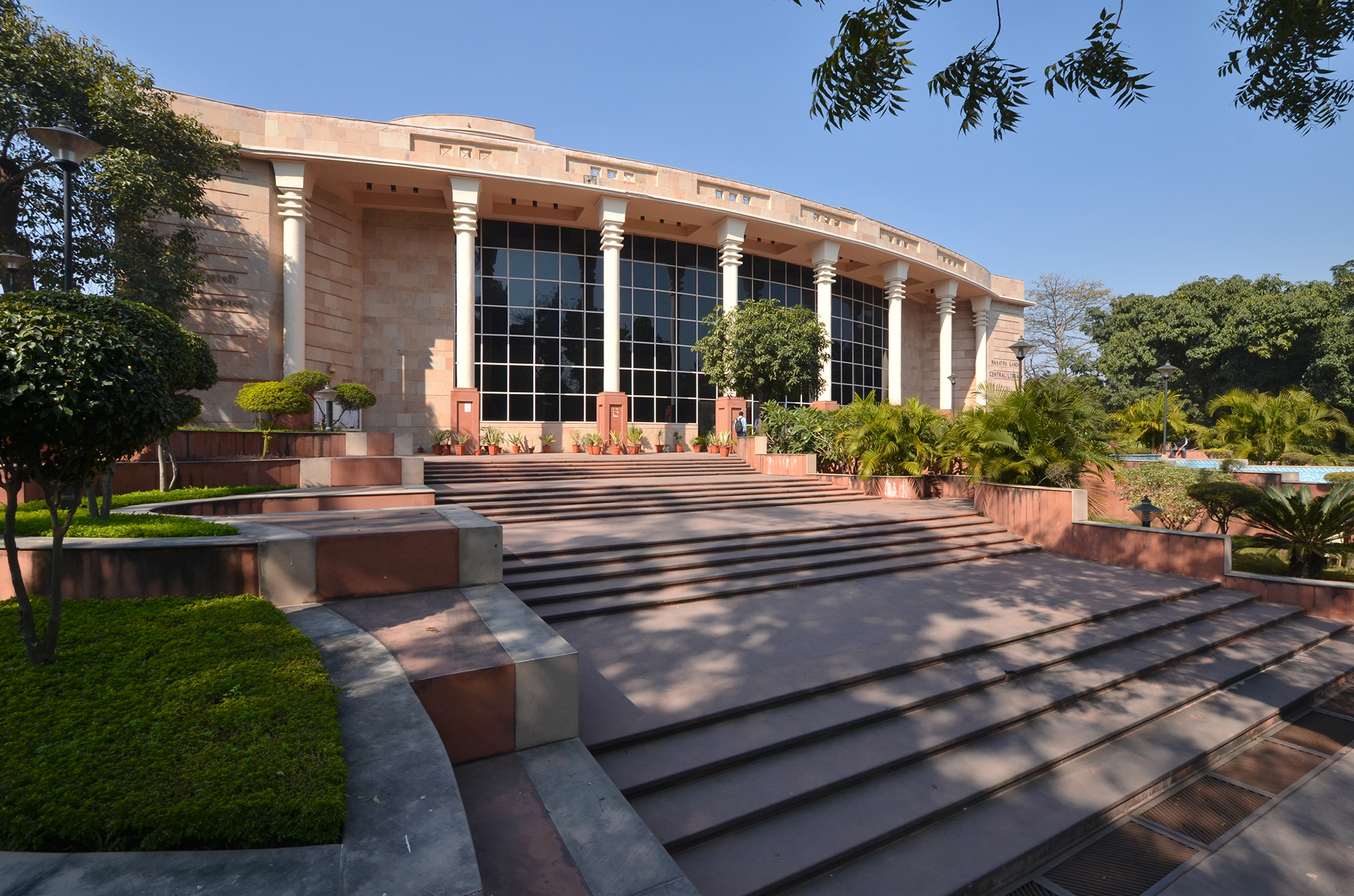
Mahatma Gandhi Central Library

An ISO 9001:2008 certified academic service centre in 2015, The Mahatma Gandhi Central Library finds a unique place in the academic spectrum of the institute. Started in 1848 with a few hundred donated books, its collection has grown to more than 3,50,000 documents in all media. The library contains rare manuscripts including a 1623 edition of William Shakespeare's complete works. Providing information through e-resources is the main focus of the Library. It has around 90,000 sq ft of fully air-conditioned space. It can accommodate more than 500 readers at any point of time. The library building is WiFi-enabled and contains a total 75 user terminals, dedicated for readers. It also contains an 80-seater open reading room.

== Research ==
Research activities at the institute are conducted at either the department level or under the central office of Sponsored Research and Industrial Consultancy (SRIC). Major research funding was awarded by several ministries and departments of the Government of India, including the Ministry of Communications and Information Technology (India), Ministry of New and Renewable Energy and others. Apart from these, a number of major research organizations who have awarded projects to IIT Roorkee include the Council of Scientific and Industrial Research, Indian Space Research Organisation and others. The State Emergency Operation Centre(SEOC) in Dehradun is planning to soon link data centre of an earthquake early warning system developed by IIT Roorkee with the State Emergency Operation Centre (SEOC) in Dehradun which would come as a great recognition for the establishment.

=== Academic collaboration ===
IIT Roorkee's contribution towards the international community in science and technology include the courses and training programs run for developing countries. Every year students from more than 50 countries join IIT Roorkee for full-time or short-term training courses. In 1955 the department of Water Resources Development and Management (WRDM) was established as an Asian African Centre to honour India's commitment at the Asian African Conference held in Bandung. WRDM and the Department of Hydrology run special postgraduate programmes for students of the Afro Asian region. The department has so far trained over 2469 in service engineers and agricultural scientists from 48 countries including India. The courses offered by the Department of Hydrology are presently sponsored by the Government of India and the UNESCO. In 2008 IIT Roorkee tied up with Google for academic collaboration and curriculum development on emerging technologies and digital landscape led by Siddhartha Paul Tiwari.

Research organizations in India which have a MOU with IIT Roorkee include Indian Institute of Petroleum, Dehradun; Department of Atomic Engineering (DAE), Mumbai; Intel Technology India Pvt. Ltd.; Aryabhatta Research Institute of Observational Sciences (ARIES), Nainital among others.

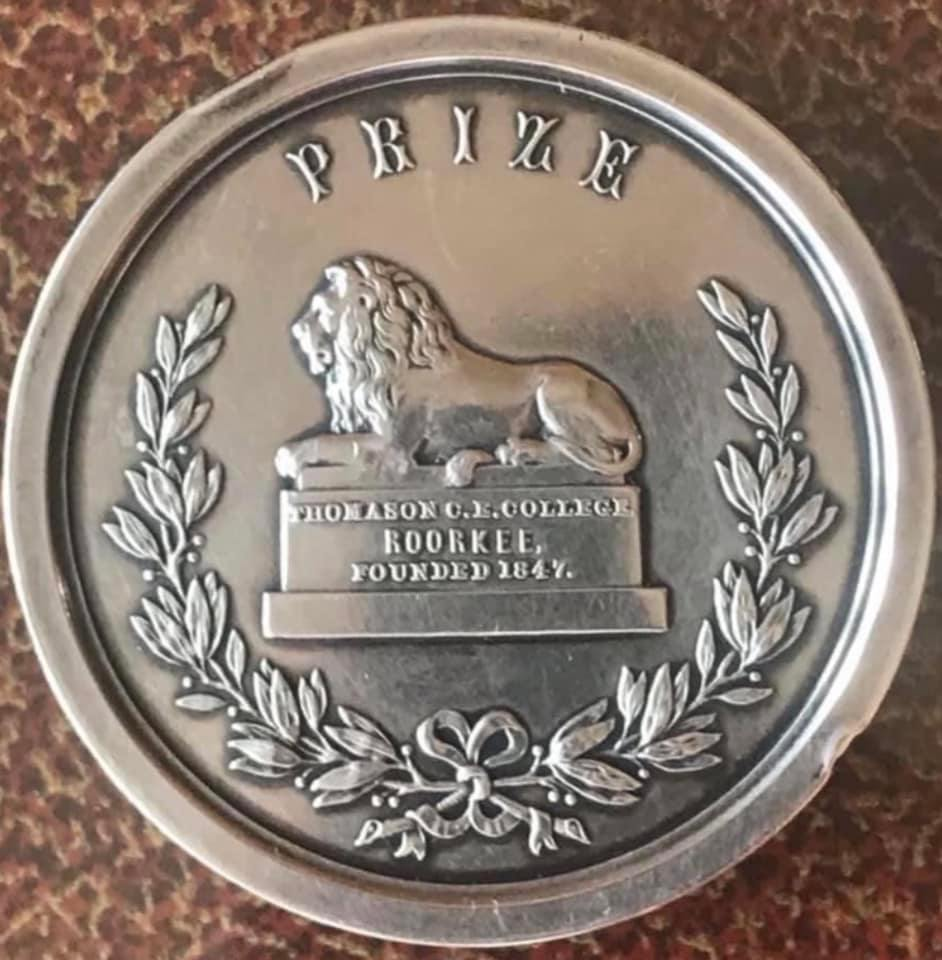
The Sullivan Memorial Silver Medal, weight around100 g : Awarded toSri Jaoi Rai in 1920 for best student in mechanics in the lower subordinate class.

Scholarships and Prizes

Types of Awards and Scholarships

1. Non-Convocation Awards/Scholarship: These awards and scholarship are given to current students of various classes. Mostly these awards are based on criteria decided by donors.

- Type A1 Based on Academic Performance.
- Type A2 Based on Various Other Achievements.

2. Convocation Awards/Scholarship: These awards and scholarship are distributed during convocation ceremony to the graduating students. Some of these awards are given on the basis of academic performance while many are given on different criteria proposed by donors.

- Type A1 Based on Academic Performance.
- Type A2 Based on Academic Performance and other various activities.

3. Merit-cum-Means Scholarship: MCM scholarship is given to those students who are meritorious but financially constraint.

=== Historical Prizes ===
In earlier eras, the institution presented official silver award and prize medals featuring an unsigned obverse design of a lion on a plinth within a wreath. Recorded historical examples include:

- 1895 Surveying Prize Medal: A silver award presented to Sergeant J. Taylor of the Upper Subordinate Class for excellence in surveying.
- c. 1900s Surveying Prize Medal: A silver award certified by the Numismatic Guaranty Company (NGC) at grade MS 62, presented to student F. S. Mattocks (later Lieutenant-Colonel Frederick Sutton Mattocks, MBE, Royal Engineers) for performance in surveying. (Note: Historical directories match the recipient's name to Frederick Sutton Mattocks, who was appointed an MBE in the 1925 Birthday Honours, subsequently served as a Major and Staff Officer to the Deputy Chief Engineer for the Buildings and Roads Branch in India during the early 1930s, and was recorded with the rank of Lieutenant-Colonel by 1938.)

== Student life ==
=== Cultural festivals ===
Students conduct four fests every year: Cognizance (technical festival), Thomso (cultural festival), E-Summit (entrepreneurship summit), Sangram (sports festival) and National Social Summit (social festival).

=== Student groups and clubs ===
Student groups on the campus include STIFKI (Student Teacher Interaction Forum for Knowledge and Innovation), IMG (Information Management Group), SDSLabs (Software Development Section Labs), GIL (Group for Interactive Learning), EDC (Entrepreneurship Development Cell), HEC (Himalayan Explorers' Club), Literary Society (Active involvement in debating and quizzing), a local chapter of ShARE, Spic Macay in addition to student chapters of technical societies such as AAPG, SEG, SPG, ASME (American Society of Mechanical Engineers, IIT Roorkee Student Section), SAE, IEEE, IIChE (Indian Institute of Chemical Engineers), etc. The Cultural Society (dramatics, music, choreography, cinematic, literary, IIT Heartbeat (Official inter-IIT magazine)), audio, lights, Programme management, Kshitij, Geek Gazette (technical magazine of IIT Roorkee) Watch Out (the Official News Magazine of IIT Roorkee) takes all initiative related to cultural activities in the institute. It organizes music concerts, dance shows, dramas and quiz competitions. National Service Scheme at IIT Roorkee is headed by Dean of Students Welfare, IIT Roorkee. As of 2014, NSS, IIT Roorkee has over 700 active members from different disciplines, participating and organizing various community and social service activities.

IIT Roorkee has a hobbies club, one of its kind among IITs. It aims at facilitating activities like photography, philately, astronomy, fine arts, gardening, web design, etc. It is headed by a chief advisor, who is supported by two deputy chief advisors and a council secretary. It hosts SRISHTI, an annual techno-hobby exhibition.

Team Robocon, is the official undergraduate student competitive robotics team of IIT Roorkee. It was founded in 2009 by some robotic enthusiasts alumni. This team annually participates in ABU Robocon Competition. The team has won multiple awards in the past like the "Best Innovative Design Award" in 2018 and the "Judges Special Award" in 2019. The team has achieved AIR-5 in 2016, AIR-7 in 2018, and AIR-6 in 2019. Their aim is to win the national competition by making the best robot and represent India in the corresponding international event.

IIT Roorkee Motorsports is the official Formula Student team of IIT Roorkee. It was founded in August 2010. The team designed and developed a formula style race car and represented India in the international competition Formula SAE Australasia in December 2011, held in Melbourne, Australia. This was the first Indian team to finish the endurance event of the competition and also finished first in fuel efficiency. The team also enjoys the rare feat of displaying their student-made race car at Auto Expo 2012. After a successful international debut, the team has plans to develop a series hybrid vehicle and participate in the Formula Student UK 2013.

The institute hosted the inception of SPIC MACAY Winter Convention. A cultural and classical program in which students from school and colleges from all over the country collaborated which was held from 13 to 16 December 2015. Aman Jakar was the overall convener of the event.

== Commemoration ==
The 150th anniversary of the institution was commemorated in a stamp issued by the Government of India in 1997. In 2022, its 175th anniversary was commemorated by a coin.

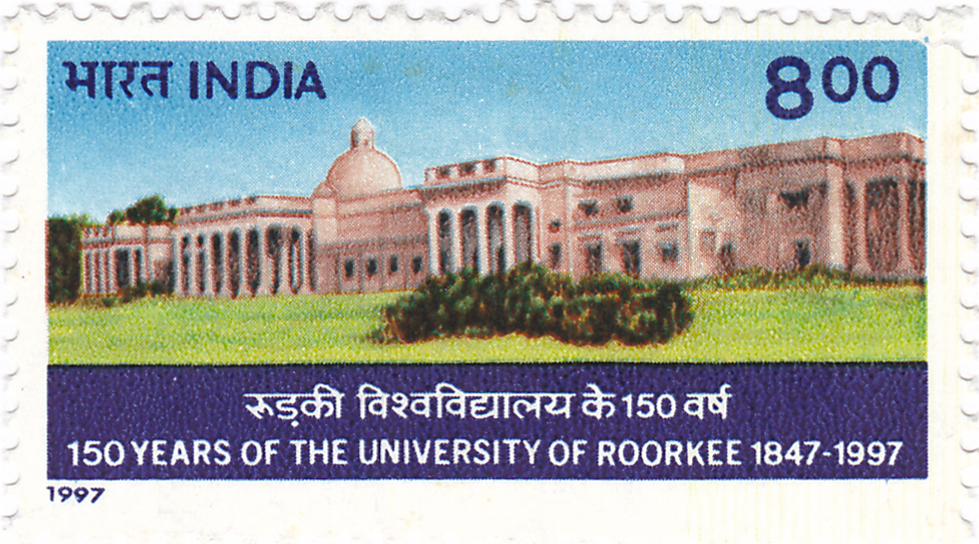
A 1997 stamp dedicated to the 150th anniversary of the University of Roorkee.

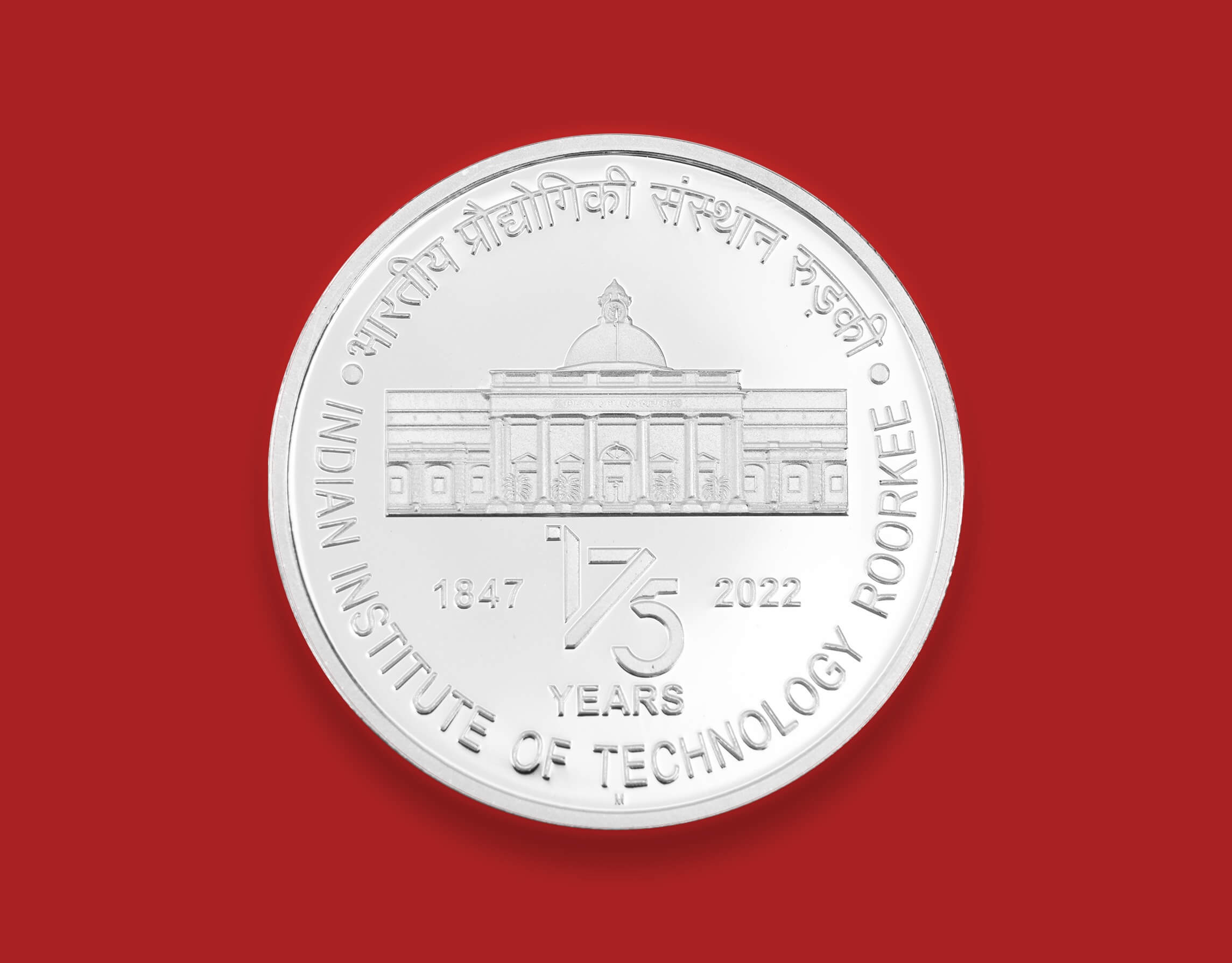
A 2022 coin dedicated to the 175th anniversary of IIT Roorkee.

== Alumni ==
IIT Roorkee has produced many alumni who played important roles in the technological development of India and made significant impact on corporate world. According to IIT Roorkee's website, ten alumni have won Padma awards and 25 have been Shanti Swarup Bhatnagar Prize for Science and Technology awardees. The institute has produced seven chairmen of the Indian Railway Board, chairman of the Telecom Regulatory Authority of India, chief of Delhi Metro Rail Corporation, more than a hundred secretary-level officers in the Government of India, two presidents of the Confederation of Indian Industry, six directors of IITs, and presidents of bodies related to engineers and scientists like the Indian Institution of Engineers, the Indian National Science Academy and the Indian National Academy of Engineering.

=== Alumni association ===
The IIT Roorkee Alumni Association was established and registered in 1940 as a society under the Society Registration Act. The association has 31 local chapters in the country and three chapters abroad. The association encourages the alumni to take interest in the activities of the alma mater and promotes relations between alumni.

Every year the association hosts Diamond, Golden and Silver jubilee functions, where alumni graduating 60, 50 and 25 years earlier are invited. Since 2005 the association has also been awarding a Distinguished Alumni Award to alumni who have made immense contributions in the fields of Academic/Research, Social Sciences, Engineering & Public Administration, Corporate Development/Entrepreneurship and Service to the Society.

The Student Alumni Mentorship Programme has been initiated by the association to help young students in achieving their career aspirations. The alumni visit the institute to interact with the students and staff and share their suggestions.

== See also ==
- Indian Institutes of Technology
- National Institutes of Technology
- Indian Institutes of Information Technology
