= Engineering education in India =

India has the largest numbers of engineers as well as the largest number of engineering education institutes and infrastructure in the world. As of 2021, India produces approximately one million engineering graduates. annually, according to AICTE data. India's technical education infrastructure includes 3500 engineering colleges, 3400 polytechnics and 200 schools of planning and architecture.

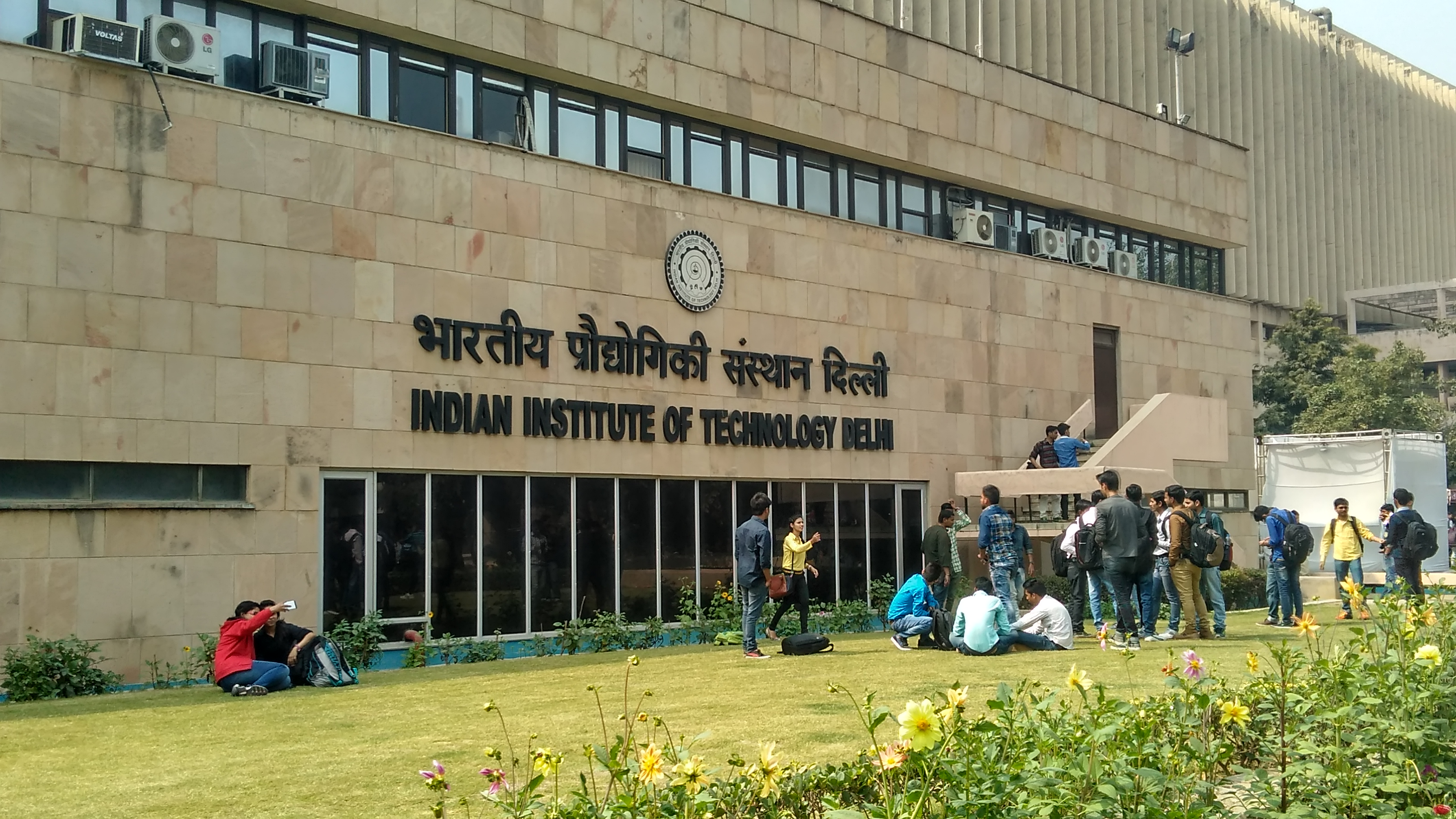
IIT Delhi - A prominent engineering institute in India

Of the hundreds of thousands of engineering graduates produced every year, less than 5% of the engineers are produced by the pan-India national level autonomous institutes created by the acts of parliament, such as the Indian Institutes of Technology (IITs), National Institutes of Technology (NITs) and Indian Institutes of Information Technology (IIITs), a little over 5% are produced by state level autonomous institutes and unitary universities approved by UGC. The remaining over 90% of the engineering graduates are produced by the private and non-autonomous state level engineering education institutes which must obtain the approval from the regulatory authority All India Council for Technical Education (AICTE) to run such courses before they start admitting students.

Most common engineering branches in Undergraduate are Computer science and engineering, Electronics and Communication engineering, Electrical and electronic engineering, Mechanical engineering, Civil engineering and Chemical engineering.

== History ==
There is long history of science and technology in the Indian subcontinent. The western style engineering education commenced during the British Raj as a necessity for the training of overseers for construction and maintenance of public buildings, roads, canals, and ports, and for the training of artisans and craftsmen for the use of instruments, and apparatus needed for the army, the navy, and the survey department. While superintending engineers were mostly recruited from Britain, lower grade craftsmen, artisans and sub-overseers were recruited locally. The necessity to make them more efficient, led to the establishment of industrial schools attached to the Ordnance Factories Board and other engineering establishments.

In 1847, India's the first engineering college Thomason College of Civil Engineering (now called IIT Roorkee) was established at Roorkee in present-day Uttarakhand state for the training of Civil Engineers. It was followed by College of Engineering, Pune's precursor, The Poona Engineering Class and Mechanical School in July 1854.

== Legal and regulatory framework ==
Universities and institutes deemed to be universities are approved by the University Grants Commission. In 2021, there are nearly 900 government and private universities and 45,000 colleges affiliated to these universities.

All institutes, universities engineering colleges as well as government or privately funded engineering colleges affiliated to the universities, must obtain an approval from the AICTE which licenses and regulates the institutes, not the individuals or practitioners, which offer the engineering and/or technical education. IITs, IIITs and NITs, etc. do not require approval from UGC or AICTE as these are created as the autonomous organisations through the act of parliament, hence they have full autonomy to decide their teaching standards, course design, curriculum, fee, etc. Engineering colleges run by the Central Universities, which were not created as the autonomous institutes along the lines of IITs, IIITs or NITs, must also seek AICTE approval.

== Pan-India or national level institutes ==
These are either founded and funded or approved by the union Government of India such as the IITs, NITs, IIITs and GFTIs. Admission to those are done by Joint Entrance Examination for Undergraduate and Graduate Aptitude Test in Engineering for Post graduate.

=== Indian Institutes of Technology ===
The Indian Institutes of Technology (IITs) has 23 centers located in Bhubaneswar, Mumbai, Delhi, Gandhinagar, Guwahati, Hyderabad, Indore, Jodhpur, Kanpur, Kharagpur, Chennai, Mandi, Patna, Roorkee, Ropar, Dhanbad, Palakkad, Tirupati, Bhilai, Goa, Jammu, Dharwad and Varanasi. All IITs enjoy the status of the Institutes of National Importance and are autonomous universities that draft their own curricula. Admission to undergraduate B.Tech and integrated M.Tech. programs are through the Joint Entrance Examination - Advanced (JEE Advanced) in which around 180,000 students appear annually out of which only around 48,000 students qualify. These 180,000 students are initially sorted out by the Joint Entrance Examination - Main (JEE Main) which is conducted by the National Testing Agency (NTA). Around 1.2 million students appear for this exam. Admission to most postgraduate courses in IITs is granted through various written entrance examinations: Graduate Aptitude Test in Engineering (GATE), Joint Admission Test (JAM) and Common Entrance Examination for Design (CEED) for M.Tech., M.Sc. and M.Des. courses. The admission for Ph.D. program is based primarily on a personal interview, though candidates may also have to appear for written tests. The IITs are also well known for their special reservation policy, which is significantly different from the one applied in other educational institutions of India.

=== National Institutes of Technology ===
The National Institutes of Technology (NITs) are colleges of engineering and technology education in India. All NITs enjoy the status of the Institutes of National Importance and are autonomous universities that draft their own curricula. They were originally called Regional Engineering Colleges (RECs). In 2002, the Ministry of Human Resource Development, Government of India, decided to upgrade, in phases, all the original 17 RECs as NITs. There are currently 31 NITs, with the inception of 10 new NITs in the year 2010 and another in 2015. The 31 NITs are located in Allahabad, Agartala, Bhopal, Durgapur, Hamirpur, Kozhikode, Kurukshetra, Jalandhar, Jamshedpur, Jaipur, Nagpur, Patna, Raipur, Rourkela, Silchar, Srinagar, Surathkal, Surat, Tiruchirappalli, Warangal, Yupia, New Delhi, Farmagudi, Imphal, Shillong, Aizawl, Chümoukedima, Karaikal, Ravangla, Uttarakhand and Tadepalligudem. The Government of India has introduced the NITSER Act to bring 31 such institutions within the ambit of the act and to provide them with complete autonomy in their functioning. The NITs are deliberately scattered throughout the country in line with the government norm of an NIT in every major state of India to promote regional development. The individual NITs, after the introduction of the NITSER Act, have been functioning as autonomous technical universities and hence can draft their own curriculum and functioning policies. The admission to undergraduate programs of all the NITs was done by the All India Engineering Entrance Examination popularly known as AIEEE. From the year 2013, AIEEE was replaced by the Joint Entrance Examination - Main (JEE Main) in which 40% weightage was given to the Higher Secondary results and 60% weightage was given to the JEE(Main) results. However, the weightage of Higher Secondary result was made to be 0% from the year 2017 onwards and it was only given as an eligibility criteria (of either attaining 75% in HS results or being in the top 20% of the respective board). The examination is objective by nature and is conducted by the National Testing Agency (NTA) from the year 2019. The exam was previously conducted by the Central Board of Secondary Education (CBSE). More than twelve lakh (1,200,000 or 1.2 million) applicants took part in 2013 for approximately 15500 seats in the B. Tech and B. Arch programmes available in all the NITs put together.

=== Indian Institutes of Information Technology ===
Indian Institutes of Information Technology (IIITs) are a group of 26 Interdisciplinary Technical Universities of higher education in India, focused on Computer science and engineering and Information Technology. Five of them are established, funded and managed by the Ministry of Human Resource Development. The rest 21 are set up on the public-private partnership (PPP) model.

Admissions into undergraduate programmes in IIITs for 6,000 seats are through the Joint Seat Allocation Authority and JEE-Main. For postgraduate programs admission is through Graduate Aptitude Test in Engineering (GATE). They follow similar academic policies as that of NITs.

=== Other Central technical Institutions ===
There are more than 30 Government Funded Technical Institutes in addition to IITs, NITs and IIITs. They also follow similar academic and admission policies of IITs, NITs and IIITs.

=== Private deemed universities ===
Birla Institute of Technology and Science Pilani, Amrita Vishwa Vidyapeetham, Vellore Institute of Technology, and International Institute of Information Technology, Hyderabad are some of the top private deemed universities in the country. The curriculum here is more updated and flexible than public Universities. Admission to Bachelor programs in Engineering in these Institutes is based on Joint Entrance Examination – Main as well as independently conducted entrances. Separate exams such as BITSAT for Birla Institute of Technology and Science, Pilani and VITEEE for Vellore Institute of Technology are also required to be given for admission to these institutes.

=== The Institution of Engineers (India) ===
The IEI was established in 1920 in Kolkata, West Bengal and pioneered education in engineering. IEI conducts an examination for its Associate Membership (AMIE). This examination is considered equivalent to B.E. / B. Tech for competitive examinations like the Indian Civil Service, Indian Engineering Services, GATE, etc., and for employment in Government, public and private sectors in India.

There are 2 sections, namely Section A and Section B. Passing both sections means the candidate will be considered a chartered engineer (CEng).

As per AICTE, AMIE is recognized as equivalent to bachelor's degree in appropriate branch of engineering, to those who had enrolled themselves with the institution on or before 31 May 2013. Refer notification from AICTE website.

== State-level institutes by the state ==
As of 2021, India has 28 states each with own government elected separately from the national government (also called union or federal government), and 8 union territories which are administered by the union government. Each state can find and fund own state level technical education institutes and it can also approve such institutes in the private sector, both of these legally remained confined to the specific state within and by which they were created. All these institutes must also obtain AICTE approval for conformation to the engineering and technology education teaching infrastructure and minimum standards.

== Issues ==
=== Illegal capitation fee ===
Some of the engineering colleges have been known for involving themselves in the illegal practice of capitation fee. All India Council for Technical Education (AICTE), the regulatory body for technical education in India, has called "upon the students, parents and the general public not to pay any capitation fee or any other fee other than that mentioned in the Prospectus of the Institutions for consideration of admission.". AICTE also mentions that the fee charged from students, has to be approved by the fee regulatory committee of the state, and the institute should mention the fee in its website. As per AICTE norms, the educational institutions are not meant to charge a fee higher than what is mentioned in the prospectus. Educational regulatory agencies such as UGC and regional level fee regulating bodies has mandated that an institution should include the fee in the prospectus.

== See also ==
- History of science and technology in the Indian subcontinent
- Science and technology in India
- Science and technology studies in India
- Information technology in India
