= National Institute of Technology, Puducherry =

Autonomous public technical and research university in Karaikal, India

- Emblem of NIT Puducherry
- Type: Public Technical University (Institute of National Importance)
- Established: 2010; 16 years ago
- Accreditation: NAAC
- Academic affiliations: UGC
- Endowment: Ministry of Human Resource Development (India)
- Chairperson: Dr. Kota Harinarayana
- Director: Dr. Makarand Madhao Ghangrekar
- Location: Karaikal, Union Territory of Puducherry, 609609, India; 10°59′21″N 79°50′47″E
- Campus: 258 acres (104 ha); Urban / Coastal Enclave
- Language: English
- Acronym: NITPY
- Nicknames: NITians, NITPYians
- Website: www.nitpy.ac.in

National Institute of Technology Puducherry (NIT Puducherry or NITPY), is an autonomous public technical and research university located in the city of Karaikal in Union Territory of Puducherry, a place forming a coastal enclave in the Kaveri river delta, between the Mayiladuthurai, Tiruvarur and Nagapattinam districts of Tamil Nadu. Founded and Established in 2010, it is one among the 31 National institutes of Technology of India and is declared as an Institute of National Importance by the Government of India under National Institutes of Technology, Science Education and Research Act, 2007.

Most people think that NITPY is located in Pondicherry (former name of ' Puducherry') district of Puducherry but in reality is around 135 kilometers away located in the Karaikal district of Puducherry.

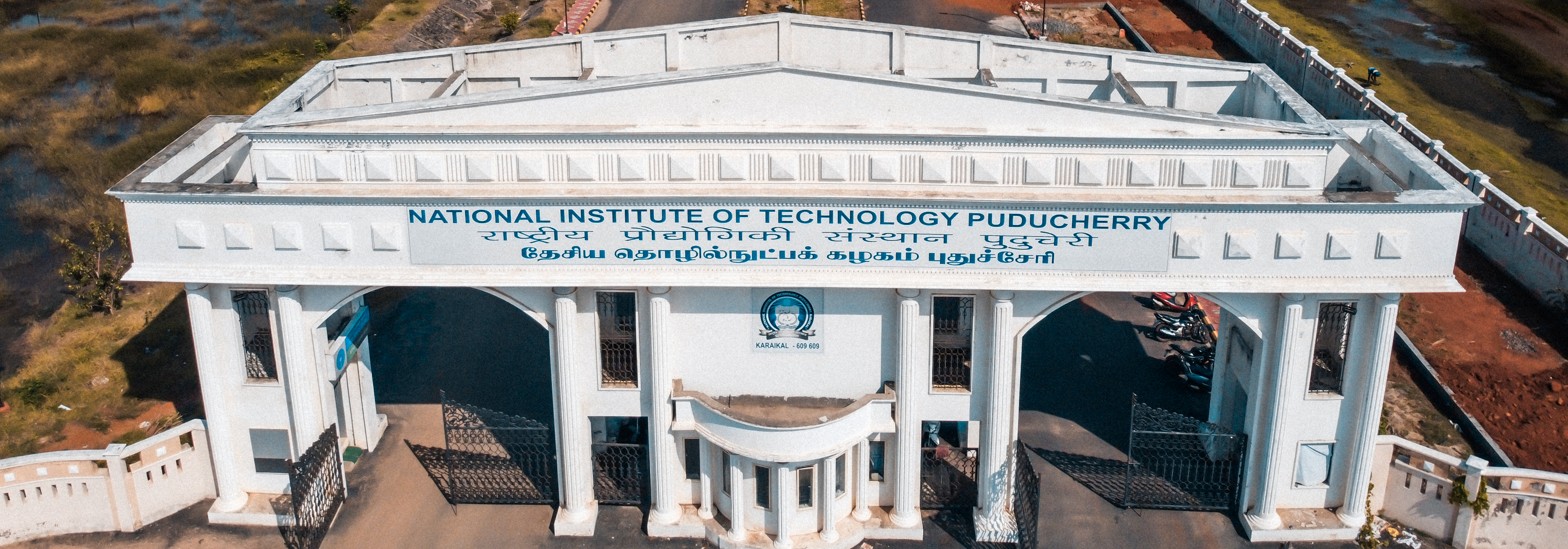
Main Arch at the Southern End of the Campus

== History ==
NIT Puducherry is one of the ten NITs, sanctioned by the Government of India in 2009, as part of the Eleventh Five-Year Plan (2007–2012). The institute was mentored by National Institute of Technology, Tiruchirappalli in the initial years.

== Organisation and administration ==
=== Governance ===
The President of India is the ex officio visitor of all the National Institutes of Technology (NITs). The National Institutes of Technology Council (NIT Council) works directly under him and it includes the minister-in-charge of technical education in Central Government, the Chairman and the Directors of all the NITs, the Chairman of University Grants Commission (India), the Director-General of Council of Scientific and Industrial Research, the Directors of other selected central institutions of repute, members of Parliament, Joint Council Secretary of Ministry of Human Resource Development, nominees of the Central Government, All India Council for Technical Education and the Visitor. The NIT Council is the highest decision making body in the NIT fraternity and is answerable only to the Government of India. The NIT Council is expected to meet regularly and take steps conducive for maximum growth of the NITs as whole in the near future.

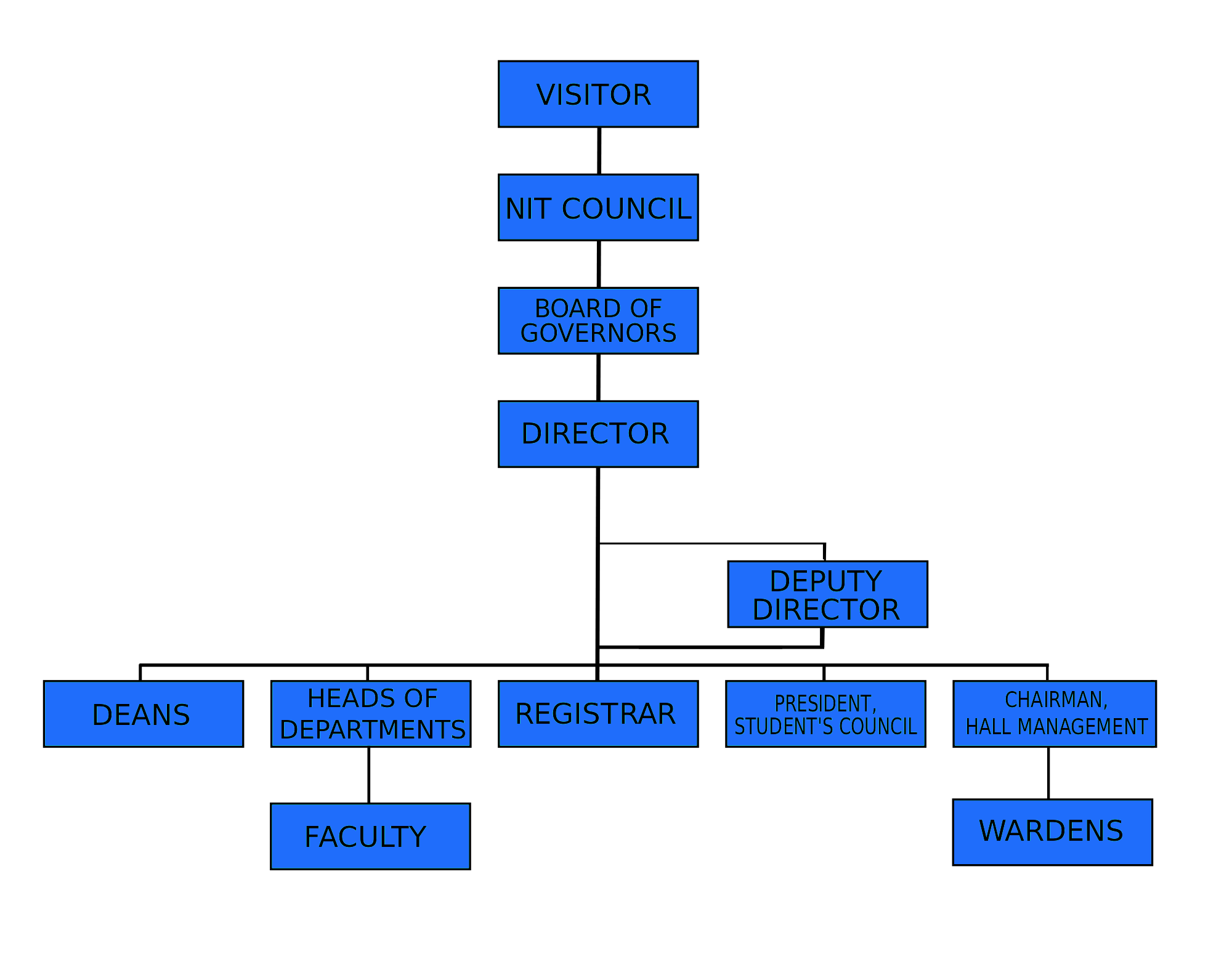
Organisation Structure of National Institute of Technology

Below the NIT Council is each NIT's Board of Governors. Each institute has a Board of Governors responsible for its administration and control. The Board of Governors of each NIT consists of the chairman and other members, which include government, industry, alumni, deans and associate deans, registrar, head of departments and faculty representation. The Director is the chairperson of the Senate and serves under the Board of Governors and is the Institute's chief academic and executive officer. The Registrar is the chief administrative officer and overviews day-to-day operations. Below the Head of Department, are the various faculty members (professors, assistant professors, and lecturers).

Academic policies are decided by the Senate, which is composed of some professors and other representatives. The Senate controls and approves the curriculum, courses, examinations, and results. Senate committees examine specific academic matters. The teaching, training, and research activities of various departments of the institute are periodically reviewed to maintain educational standards.

The NITs across India and are fully funded institutions under the Central Government with Deemed to be University status. The move was intended to make the institutions centers of excellence and being developed as autonomous and flexible academic institutions of excellence to meet the sweeping changes taking place in the industrial environment in post liberalized India and also the rapidly changing scene of technical education globally.

=== Departments ===
NIT Puducherry has ten departments based on Engineering, Sciences and Humanities.

- Chemistry
- Civil Engineering
- Computer Science and Engineering
- Education
- Electrical and Electronics Engineering
- Electronics and Communication Engineering
- Humanities and Social Sciences
- Mathematics
- Mechanical Engineering
- Physics

== Campus ==
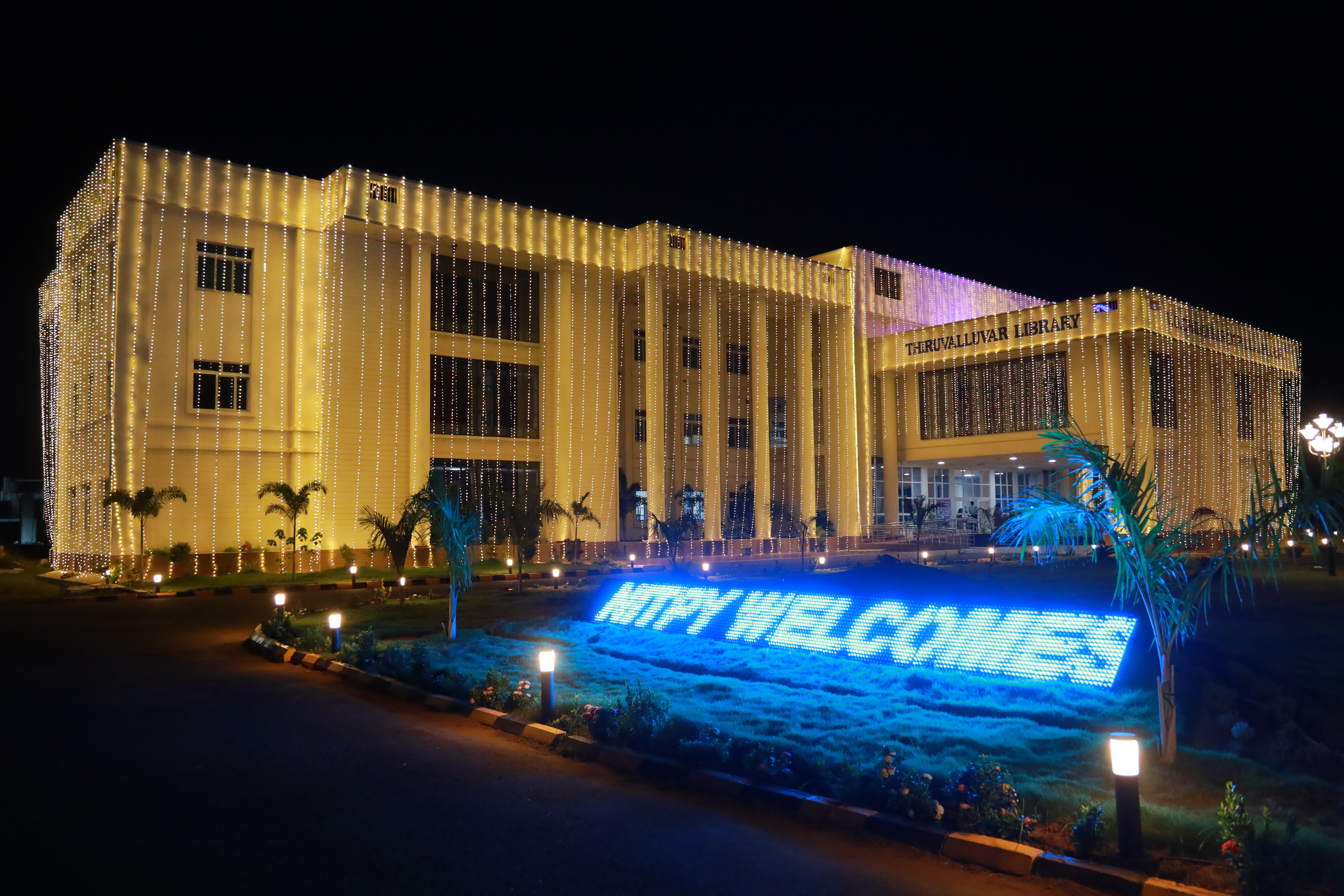
The V. O. Chidambaram Pillai Administrative Block

The campus spans around 258 acres (1.044km^{2}) of lush green land in the suburban villages of Poovam and Thiruvettakudy of the city of Karaikal in the Union territory of Puducherry. The main entrance is located on the Southern end of the campus at Thiruvettakudy, around 3 km towards east from National Highway 32 (East Coast Road). There is an other entrance located at Poovam in the western end of the campus. The Institute is located about 135 km from Puducherry, 162 km from Tiruchirappalli and 300 km from Chennai.

The campus consists of an Administrative Block, Science Block, Guest House, Cafeteria, Central Library, Director and Staff Residence Complex, three Student Hostels and a Composite Engineering Complex called PENTAGON with five separate buildings for each of the engineering departments.

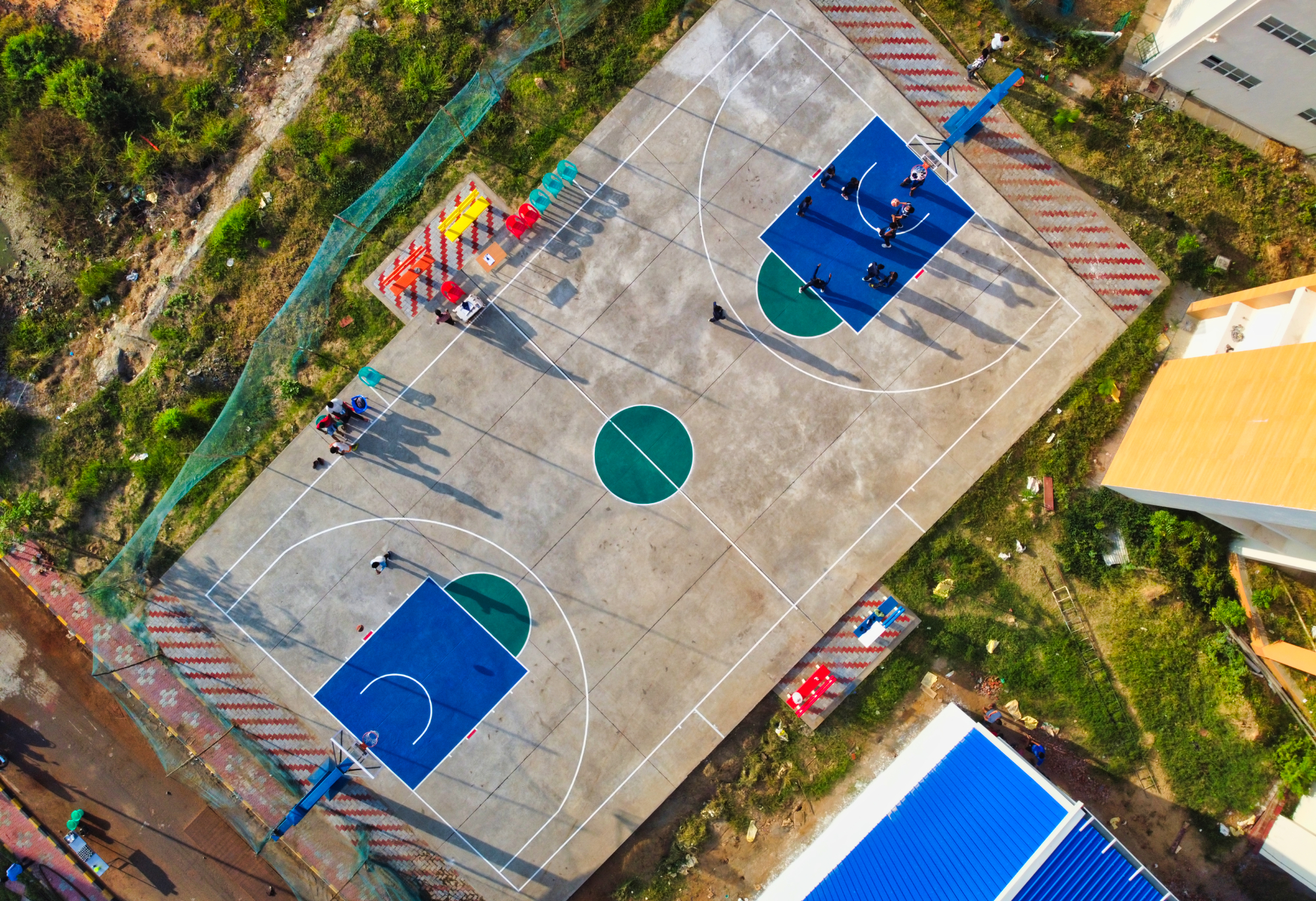
Basketball Ground near Barani Hostel at NITPY

The institute also has Sports complex with Football Ground, Basketball Ground, Cricket Ground, Badminton court, Beach Volleyball Ground, Kho-Kho court, Kabaddi court, Gymnasium, Athletic Field and an Indoor Sports Square for Chess, Carrom and Table Tennis.

Other amenities on campus includes an on-campus State Bank of India branch and its ATM, Medical Centre with a pharmacy and a stationeries and provision store. The entire Institute and Hostels are all equipped with Internet via Wi-Fi and Ethernet.

== Academics ==
=== Admission ===
Admission to the Undergraduate programs (B.Tech) is highly competitive and is based on the rank secured by the candidates in the Joint Entrance Examination (Main) conducted by National Testing Agency (NTA). Candidates must also secure at least 75% marks in the 12th class examination, or be in the top 20 percentile in the 12th class examination conducted by the respective Central/State Boards. For Scheduled Castes/Scheduled Tribes students, the qualifying marks would be 65% in the 12th class examination. The examination is considered to be one of the toughest examinations in the world.

In total number of seats available 50% of seats are reserved for the candidates having residence/native (home state) at Puducherry (includes Puducherry, Karaikal, Mahe, Yanam) and Andaman and Nicobar Islands. The remaining 50% seats are filled on All India quota basis. Joint Seat Allocation Authority(JoSSA) handles UG admission process.

Admission to Postgraduate programs (M.Tech) is done based on the rank secured by the candidate in Graduate Aptitude Test in Engineering (GATE) conducted jointly by the Indian Institute of Science and seven Indian Institutes of Technologies at Roorkee, Delhi, Guwahati, Kanpur, Kharagpur, Chennai (Madras) and Mumbai (Bombay) on behalf of the National Coordination Board – GATE, Department of Higher Education, Ministry of Education (MoE), Government of India. PG admission is made through the Centralized Counselling for MTech (CCMT).

NIT Puducherry follows the reservation policy declared by the Supreme Court of India, by which 27% of seats are reserved for Other Backward Classes (OBCs), 15% for Scheduled Castes (SCs), and 7.5% for Scheduled Tribes (STs) and 10% for economically weaker section (ews).

The institute also accepts foreign nationals through scholarships awarded by the Government of India, and Non-Resident Indians (NRIs/PIOs) through an independent scheme known as Direct Admission for Students Abroad (DASA).

=== Courses ===
==== Undergraduate programs ====
===== B.Tech =====
The institute offers four-year B.Tech degree courses in the following disciplines:

- Computer Science and Engineering
- Electronics and Communication Engineering
- Electrical and Electronics Engineering
- Mechanical Engineering
- Civil Engineering

===== B.Sc. B.Ed. =====
The institute has a four-year B.Sc. B.Ed Integrated Teachers Education program. The B.Sc. course hass science subjects physics, chemistry, and mathematics as majors in addition to mandatory languages and pedagogy techniques.

==== Post-Graduate programs ====
===== M.Tech =====
The institute offers two-year M.Tech degree coursework and research in the following disciplines:

- Computer Science and Engineering
- Communication Systems
- Power Electronics
- Digital Industry
- Disaster Resilient Infrastructures

===== M.Sc =====
The institute offers two-year M.Sc degree coursework in the following disciplines:

- Chemistry
- Mathematics
- Physics

===== Ph.D =====
The institute accepts doctoral candidates for research in the following fields:

- Chemistry
- Civil Engineering
- Computer Science and Engineering
- Electrical and Electronics Engineering
- Electronics and Communication Engineering
- English
- Mathematics
- Mechanical Engineering
- Physics

=== Climate and Transportation ===
The climate is extreme with the weather being sunny most of the time. Winter Monsoon brings rain showers in September end to December. NITPY is located in the outskirts of Karaikal.

Karaikal is a municipality, but it remains highly underdeveloped and has a rural feel. The bus stand is approximately 12 km from the back gate (Poovam Gate) of NIT Puducherry, so newcomers must take a share auto or bus, usually costing around ₹10. Individual auto-rickshaw drivers may charge as much as ₹400 from unfamiliar passengers from railway station to the college.

Similarly, the railway station is about 14 km from the front gate of NIT Puducherry, and auto-rickshaw drivers may charge around ₹300–₹400. Therefore, it is advisable for new comers to use share autos or buses instead of hiring an individual auto.

=== Rankings ===
University and college rankings

Engineering – India
- NIRF (2022): 136
- NIRF (2023): 101
- NIRF (2024): 97

NIT Puducherry ranked 136 among engineering colleges by the National Institutional Ranking Framework (NIRF) in 2022, 101st rank in 2023 and 97th rank in 2024, 99th rank in 2025. The institute has to rapidly improve a lot to compete with top 5 NITs.

== See also ==
- Puducherry Technological University
- National Institutes of Technology
- Indian Institutes of Technology
- List of Institutes of National Importance
- Joint Entrance Examination (Main)
- All India Engineering Entrance Examination
- Graduate Aptitude Test in Engineering
