= National Institute of Technology, Nagaland =

Public engineering institution in Nagaland, India

- Other name: NITN
- Motto: Education Is Power
- Type: Institute of National Importance under The NIT Act of 2007, Public
- Established: 2010; 15 years ago
- Affiliations: NIT
- Chairperson: Dr. Dasari Sreenivasulu, IAS (Retd.)
- Director: Dr. A. Elayaperumal
- Academic staff: 100
- Undergraduates: 390+
- Location: Chümoukedima, Nagaland, India; 25°47′16″N 93°46′28″E
- Campus: Urban
- Website: www.nitnagaland.ac.in

National Institute of Technology Nagaland (NIT Nagaland or NITN) is a higher education technology institute located in Chümoukedima, Nagaland, India. It is one of the 31 National Institutes of Technology in India. NIT Nagaland was set up by the Government of India in 2009, as part of the Eleventh Five-Year Plan (2007–2012) for imparting technical education in the state of Nagaland. NIT Silchar has provided initial mentorship to NIT Nagaland for the initial two years of its establishment.

The first batch of NIT Nagaland (2010-2014) studied at NIT Silchar for two years and then the NIT Nagaland has shifted to its home state, Nagaland in September 2012. NIT Nagaland is a federally funded technical university established by an Act of the Indian Parliament.

The institute is located at the Old DC Complex at Chümoukedima, about 14 km (8.7 mi) from Dimapur.

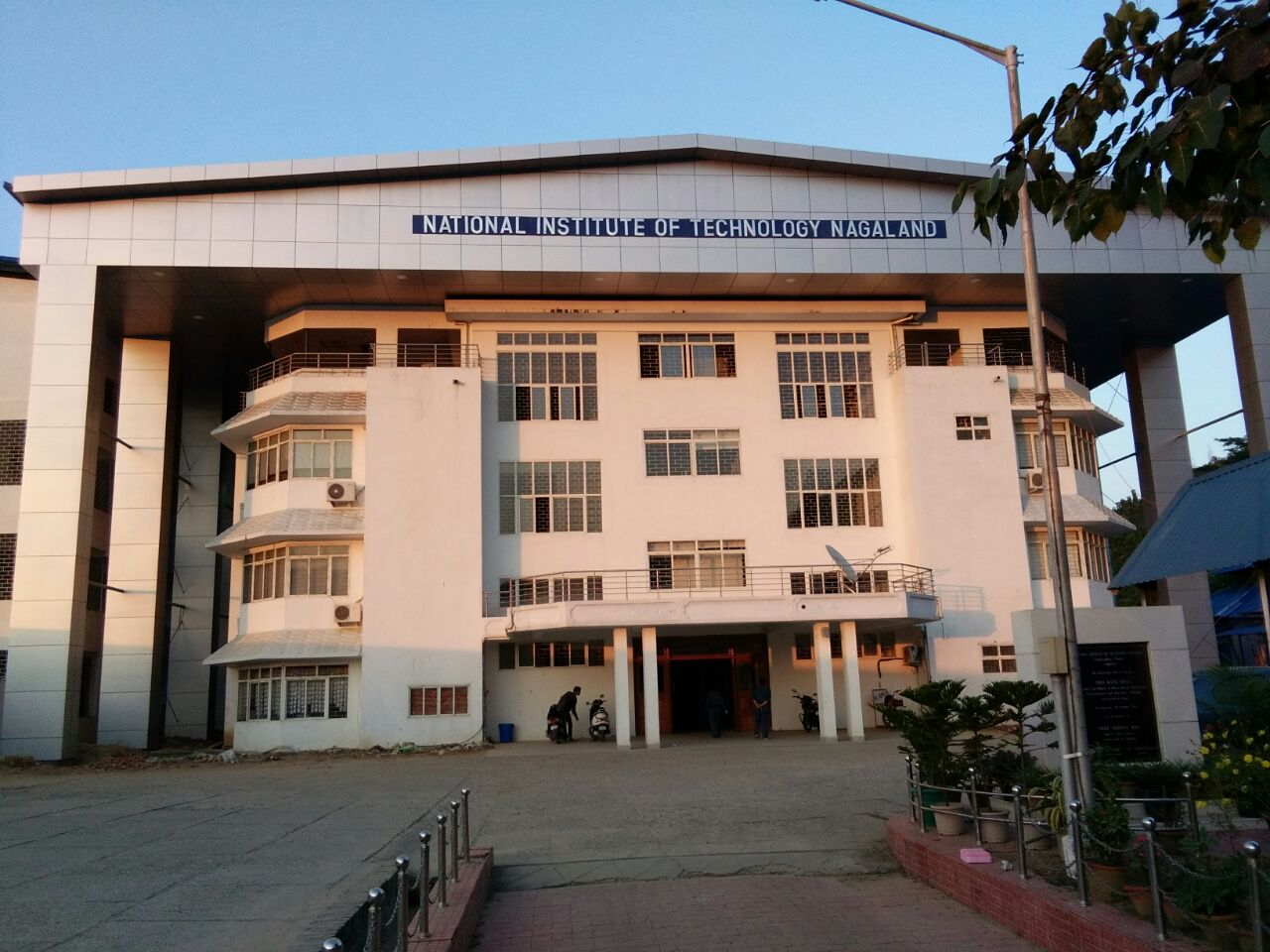
The admin building of NIT Nagaland.

NIT Nagaland is managed by the NIT Nagaland Society registered under the Societies Act. The institute is fully funded by the Ministry of Human Resource Development, Government of India. At present, six undergraduate courses in engineering namely electronics & instrumentation engineering, electrical & electronics engineering, electronics & communication engineering, computer science & engineering, civil engineering and mechanical engineering and four master course namely power system engineering, VLSI systems, computer science and engineering, communication engineering, MSc (physics) and integrated M.Sc. course B.S.M.S (material science) is running in the institute.

On 13 October 2012, former Union minister of human resource development, communication and information technology Kapil Sibal inaugurated the NIT Nagaland at Chümoukedima. The NIT foundation laying function was attended by chief minister Neiphiu Rio, Lok Sabha member C. L. Ruala, top officials of the state government and the union HRD ministry.

== Departments and centers ==
No.	Department	portrait	No.	Department	portrait
1	Electronics and Instrumentation Engineering.		2	computer Science and Engineering	
3	Civil Engineering.		4	Electrical and Electronics Engineering.	
5	Electronics and Communication Engineering.		6	Mechanical Engineering.	
7	Science and Humanities.				

== Courses offered ==
=== Undergraduate ===
No.	Department	No.	Department
1	Electronics and Instrumentation Engineering	2	Computer Science and Engineering
3	Civil engineering	4	Electrical and Electronics Engineering
5	Electronics and Communication Engineering	6	Mechanical engineering

=== Postgraduate ===
Postgraduate courses in engineering offer Master of Technology (M.Tech.) degrees. The institute also offering M.Sc. in physics courses in which students are admitted through Joint Admission Test for M.Sc. (JAM) exam. Admissions to M.Tech. is made once a year through CCMT. Currently BSMS (Material Science) (Integrated MSc programme is also continuing in the institute.)

No.	Programme	No.	Programme
1	Power System Engineering	2	VLSI Systems
3	Computer Science and Engineering	4	Communication Engineering
5	MSc (Physics)		

=== Integrated M.Sc Program ===
No.	Department
1	B.S.M.S(Material Science)

=== Ph.D ===
No.	Department	No.	Department
1	Electronics and Instrumentation Engineering	2	Computer Science and Engineering
3	Civil Engineering	4	Electrical and Electronics Engineering
5	Electronics and Communication Engineering	6	Physics
7	Chemistry	8	Mathematics
9	Humanities	10	-

== Rankings ==
University rankings

Engineering – India
- NIRF (2024): 151-200

The National Institutional Ranking Framework (NIRF) ranked NIT Nagaland between 151-200 in the engineering rankings in 2024.

== Hostels ==
NIT Nagaland provides separate hostels for boys & girls. The hostels are provided with all the basic facilities a student will need including geyser facility (only during winter), 24×7 water and electricity supply, purified drinking water, water cooler. All the hostels are provided with high speed internet facility. Adequate bus facility has also been extended for commute of staff and employees staying outside the campus.

== Laboratory ==
NIT Nagaland is well equipped with state of art laboratories. Each department has its own laboratory and the laboratories are very well equipped with the instruments and the required lab materials. Students are fully free to work in the laboratory depending on their grades, even they have the facility to work in the laboratory after closing hours with special permission.

== Annual festival ==
Ekarikthin
- Genre: Techno-Cultural
- Locations: Chümoukedima, Nagaland
- Founded: 2015
- Filing status: Student Run, non-Profit Organization
- Sponsor: National Institute of Technology Nagaland
- Website: www.ekarikthin.com

Ekarikthin is the annual techno-cultural festival of National Institute of Technology Nagaland. It is an event usually held in the month of April every year. Ekarikthin is a Sanskrit word which means sharing the same heritage. It spans over three days and is the largest techno-cultural fest of Nagaland. It provides young nurturing talented youths a platform to show their talents in various cultural and technical events. Students from all over Nagaland participate in this event.

== Research and Information Technology ==
The Computer Science and Engineering department at NIT Nagaland is research-oriented with faculty specialising in areas including information security, network security, blockchain, machine learning, deep learning, Internet of Things (IoT), image processing, biomedical imaging, and wireless communications. The department offers Ph.D. research across specialisations in data analytics, online social networks, mobile ad-hoc networks, multimedia security, and natural language processing.

The institute has hosted faculty development programmes (FDPs) on cybersecurity and ethical hacking, providing training to engineering educators from across India on topics including vulnerability assessment, exploitation techniques, and digital forensics.

NIT Nagaland is building a campus data centre, network infrastructure, IP telephony, and wireless network to support advanced computing facilities. The campus network includes enterprise-grade security infrastructure including a FortiGate firewall and enterprise antivirus, supporting secure campus-wide internet access and research computing.

In 2024, top campus recruiters in the technology sector included companies such as Publicis Sapient, Samsung, Jio Infocomm, Oracle, and Zuora, reflecting growing industry demand for graduates from the institute's engineering programmes.
