= National Institutes of Technology =

Group of engineering colleges in India

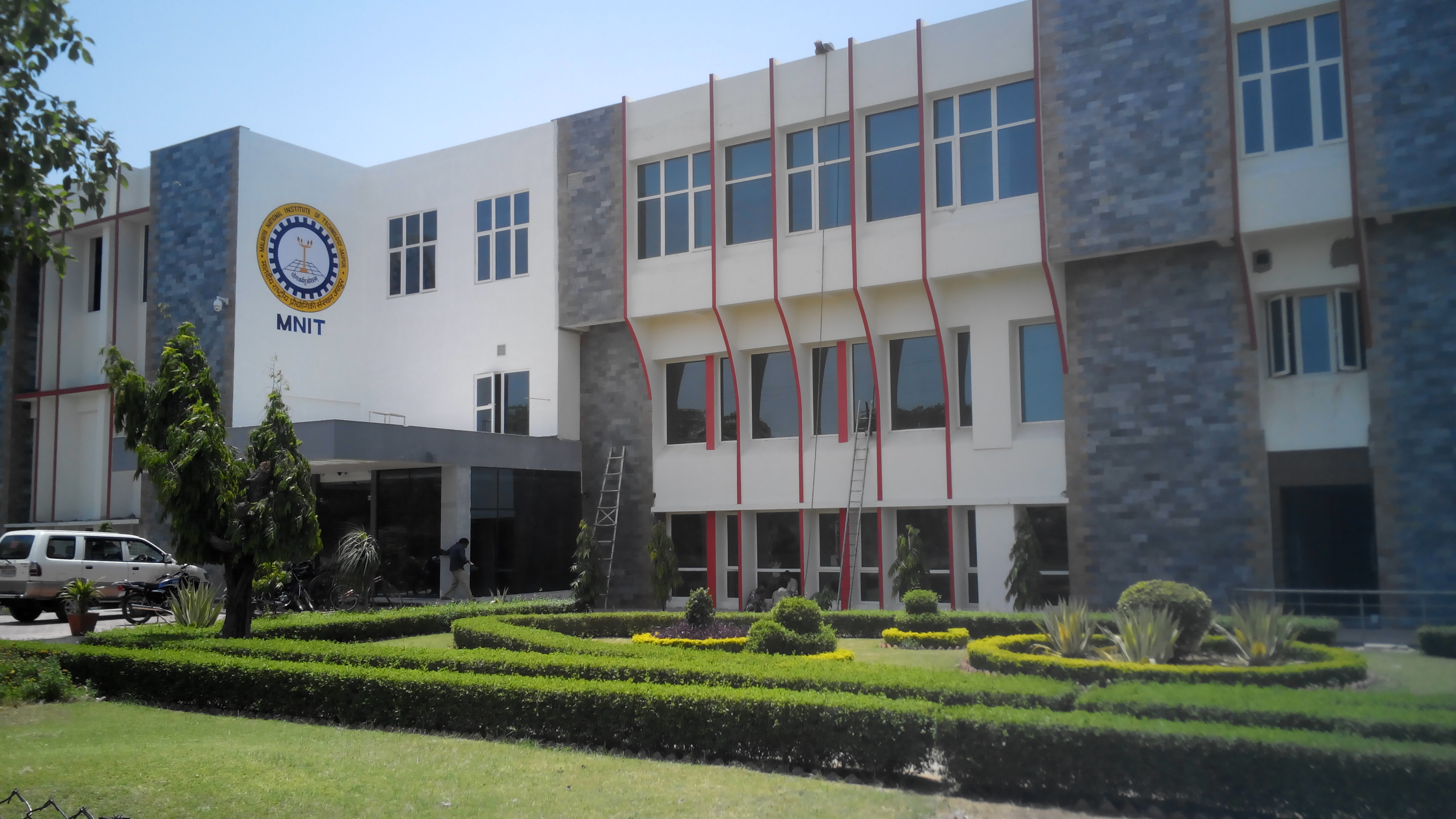
- Other name: NIT or NITs (plural)
- Type: Public Technical Institute
- Established: 15 August 2007 (via National Institutes of Technology Act, 2007)
- Parent institution: Ministry of Education, Government of India
- Budget: ₹5,687.47 crore (US$610 million) (FY2025-26 est.)
- Visitor: President of India
- Location: 32 cities in India
- Language: English
- Website: http://nitcouncil.org.in/

Location of 32 NITs including IIESTS

The National Institutes of Technology (NITs) are centrally funded technical institutes under the ownership of the Ministry of Education, Government of India. They are governed by the National Institutes of Technology, Science Education, and Research Act, 2007, which declared them institutions of national importance and laid down their powers, duties, and framework for governance. The act lists 32 NITs including IIESTS and 2 NIFTEMs. Each NIT is autonomous and linked to the others through a common council known as the Council of NITSER (NIT Council), which oversees their administration. All NITs are funded by the Government of India.

In 2020, National Institutional Ranking Framework ranked twenty four NITs in the top 200 in engineering category. The language of instruction is English at all these institutes. As of 2024, the total number of seats for undergraduate programmes is 24,229 and the total number of seats for postgraduate programmes is 11,428.

== History ==
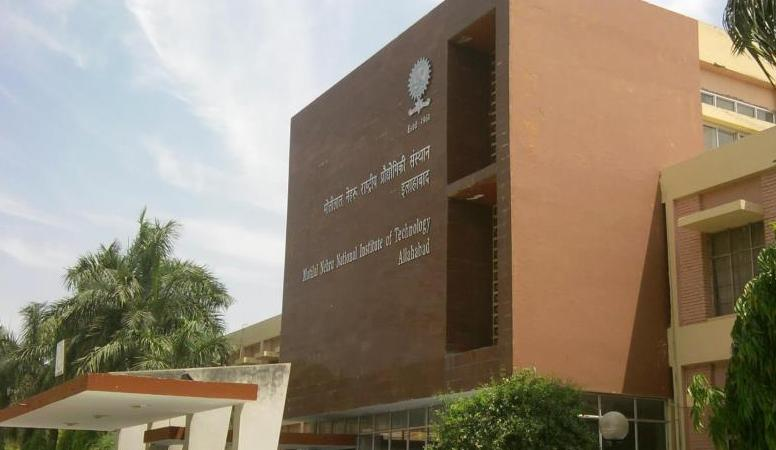
REC Allahabad was converted into NIT Allahabad in 2002.

During the second five-year plan (1956–60) in India, a number of industrial projects were contemplated. The Regional Engineering Colleges (RECs) were established by the central government to mimic the IITs at a regional level and act as benchmarks for the other colleges in that state. The admission used to be highly selective. Students topping the respective state's 12th board exam could be admitted at the REC of their state. Thus, 17 RECs were established from 1959 onwards in each of the major states. Each college was a joint and cooperative enterprise of the central government and the concerned state government. The government opened 9 RECs in 1960, 2 on average in each region, as follows:

Region	Regional Engineering Colleges (REC)
Eastern Region	Durgapur and Jamshedpur
Western Region	Nagpur, Surat, and Bhopal
Southern Region	Warangal and Surathkal
Northern Region	Srinagar and Allahabad

Later on, 6 more were added by 1967. The early 15 institutes were Srinagar, Warangal, Calicut, Durgapur, Kurukshetra, Jamshedpur, Jaipur, Nagpur, Rourkela, Surathkal, Surat, Tiruchirappalli, Bhopal, and Allahabad. It established 2 more, one in Hamirpur in 1986, and another in Jalandhar in 1987.

These were large-sized institutions judged by the standards then prevailing in the country. The considerations that weighed in this decision were:

A large-sized college would be more efficient than the equivalent small colleges, the proposed colleges have to meet the additional requirements of the country as a whole and for that purpose should have to function on an all-India basis. Therefore, the smaller they are in number and the larger in size, the better, and for the same reason their location is important from an all-India point of view.

The RECs were jointly operated by the central government and the concerned state government. Non-recurring expenditures and expenditures for post-graduate courses during the REC period were borne by the central government while recurring expenditure on undergraduate courses was shared equally by central and state governments. They were considered to be the best government engineering colleges after the IITs in India even before their upgrade to National Institutes of Technology.

The success of the technology-based industry led to high demand for technical and scientific education. Due to the enormous costs and infrastructure involved in creating globally respected Indian Institutes of Technology (IITs), in 2002 Ministry of Human Resource Development (MHRD) Minister Murli Manohar Joshi decided to upgrade RECs to "National Institutes of Technology" (NITs) instead of creating IITs. The central government controls NITs and provides all funding. In 2002, all RECs became NITs.

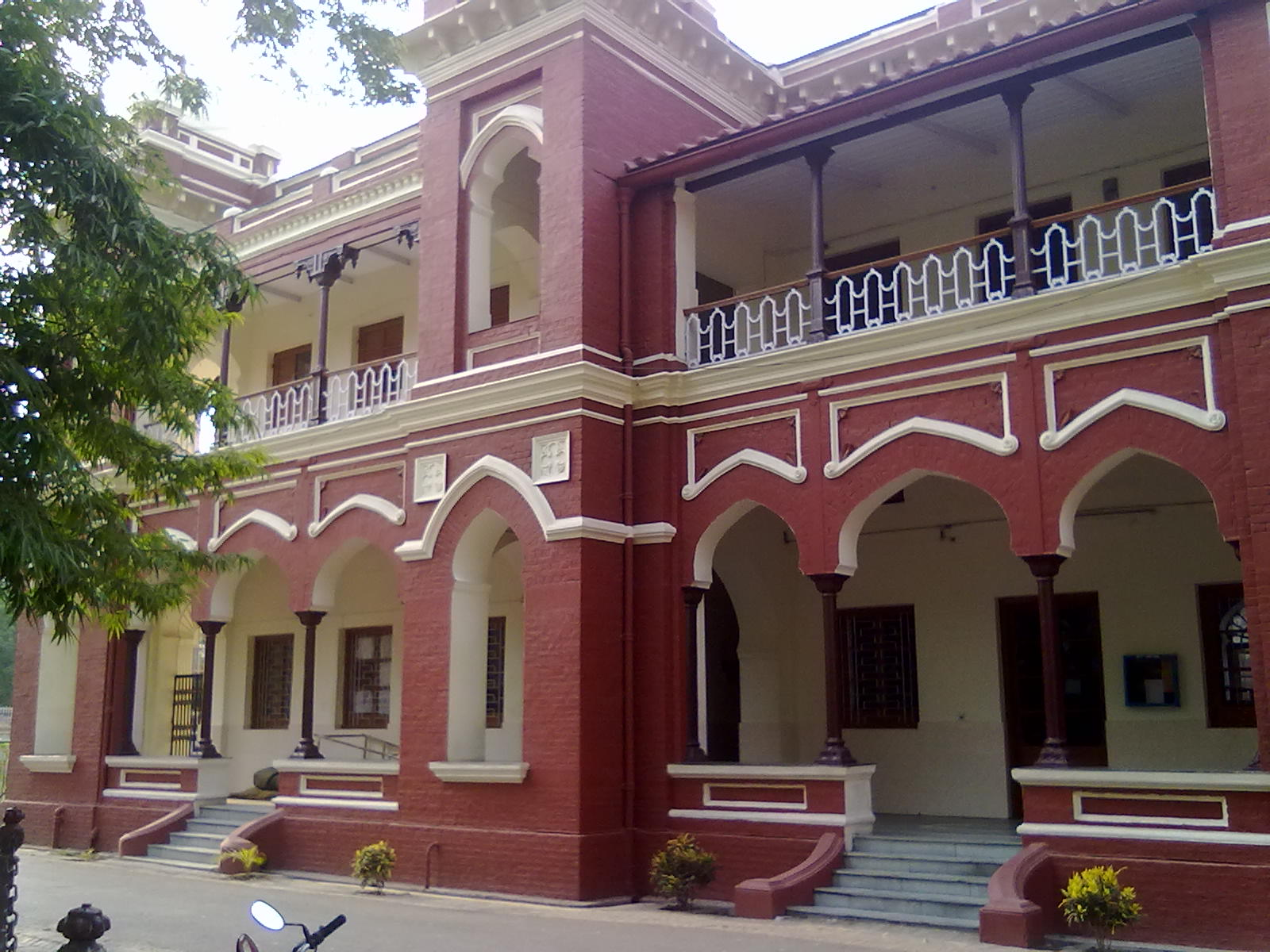
Bihar Engineering College, Patna (estd. 1886), third oldest engineering college in India, was converted to NIT Patna in 2004.

The upgrade was designed along the lines of the Indian Institutes of Technology (IITs) after it was concluded that RECs had potential as proven by the success of their alumni and their contributions in the field of technical education and that they were on par with the IITs. Subsequently, funding and autonomy for NITs increased, and they award degrees that have raised their graduates' perceived value. These changes implemented recommendations of the "High Powered Review Committee" (HPRC). The HPRC, chaired by R. A. Mashelkar, submitted its report entitled "Strategic Road Map for Academic Excellence of Future RECs" in 1998.

By 2006, MHRD issued NIT status to 3 more colleges, located at Patna (Bihar Engineering College, a 110-year-old college), Raipur (Government Engineering College, Raipur), and Agartala (Tripura Engineering College). Based on the request of state governments and feasibility, future NITs are either converted from existing institutes or can be freshly created. In 2010, the government announced setting up ten more new NITs in the remaining states/territories, leading to a total of 30 NITs. This would lead to every state in India having its own NIT.

With the technology-based industry's continuing growth, the government decided to upgrade twenty National Institutes of Technology to full-fledged technical universities. Parliament passed enabling legislation, the National Institutes of Technology Act in 2007 and took effect on 15 August of that year. The target is to fulfill the need for quality manpower in the field of engineering, science, and technology and to provide consistent governance, fee structure, and rules across the NITs. The law designates each NIT an Institute of National Importance (INI).

The Parliament of India on 1 August 2016 passed a bill to establish the 31st as well as the newest NIT, NIT Andhra Pradesh, on a day members of parliament of the ruling Telugu Desam Party from the state staged a protest to demand special category status. The National Institutes of Technology, Science Education and Research (Amendment) Bill, 2016 was passed by Rajya Sabha by voice vote. The bill was passed in Lok Sabha on 21 July 2016.

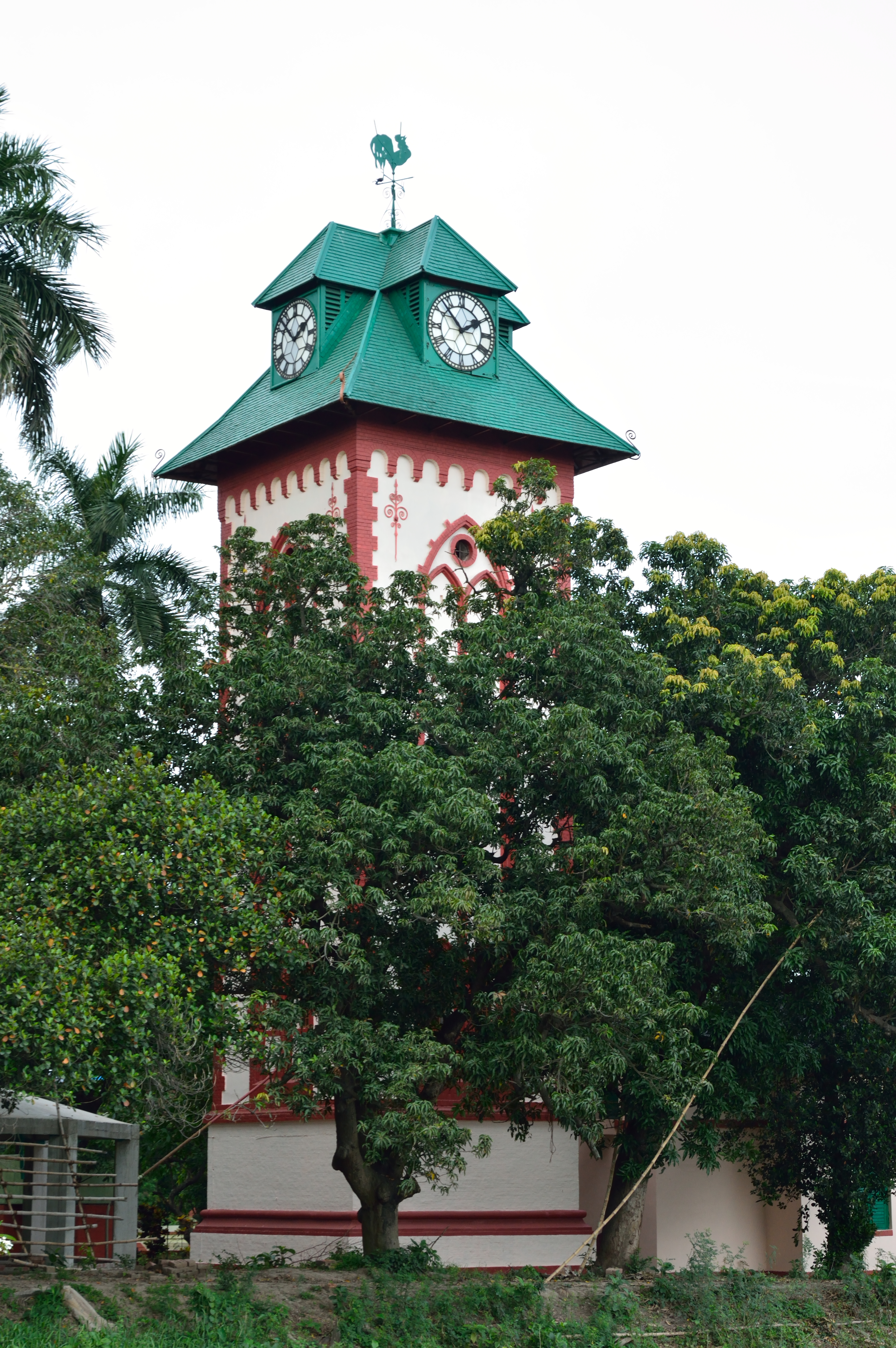
Bengal Engineering College, Shibpur(estd. 1856), second oldest engineering college in India, was converted to IIEST Shibpur in 2014 Later on came under the NIT Council in 2019.

IIEST Shibpur, originally established in 1856 as the Calcutta Civil Engineering College, is one of the oldest engineering institutions in India. Initially affiliated with the University of Calcutta and located in Kolkata, it moved to its current campus in Shibpur, Howrah, in 1880. Renamed as Bengal Engineering College in 1921, it grew into a premier institute offering various engineering disciplines. In 2004, it was upgraded to a university and became Bengal Engineering and Science University (BESU). Finally, in 2014, it was declared an Institute of National Importance and transformed into the Indian Institute of Engineering Science and Technology, Shibpur (IIEST Shibpur) under the NIT Act. In 2019, it was included in the NIT Council leading to its unofficial designation as the “32nd NIT”.

The idea of upgrading BESU to a national-level institute began gaining momentum in the early 2000s. The Prof. S.K. Joshi Committee formed by the Ministry of Education (then MHRD), recommended BESU’s elevation to an institute of national importance. During the conversion of IT-BHU to IIT (IIT BHU) in 2010, BESU was also shortlisted for a similar upgrade. While IIT status was debated, the final recommendation was to create a new category of elite institutions IIESTs and BESU was selected as the first to receive the IIEST tag. This led to its formal conversion into IIEST Shibpur in 2014 under the NIT Act, placing it under the governance of the Council of NITSER while retaining its distinct heritage and commitment to advanced education and research in engineering and science. However, plans to establish a separate category of IIEST institutes was eventually abandoned. IIEST Shibpur was subsequently integrated into the NIT Council in 2019.

== Institutes ==
NITs and locations, sorted by date of establishment
No.	Name	Abbreviation	Founded	Established as NIT	City/Town	State/UT	NIRF Rank		Website
No.	Name	Abbreviation	Founded	Established as NIT	City/Town	State/UT	Engineering	Overall	Website
1	NIT Karnataka	NITK	1960	2002	Surathkal area, Mangaluru City]	Karnataka	17	54	[1]
2	NIT Warangal	NITW	1959	2002	Warangal	Telangana	28	63	[2]
3	NIT Bhopal	MANIT	1960	2002	Bhopal	Madhya Pradesh	81	-	[3]
4	IIEST Shibpur	IIESTS	1856	2014, 2019*	Shibpur	West Bengal	54	-	[4]
5	NIT Nagpur	VNIT	1960	2002	Nagpur	Maharashtra	44	86	[5]
6	NIT Durgapur	NITDGP	1960	2002	Durgapur	West Bengal	49	-	[6]
7	NIT Jamshedpur	NITJSR	1960	2002	Jamshedpur	Jharkhand	82	-	[7]
8	NIT Srinagar	NITSRI	1960	2002	Srinagar	Jammu and Kashmir	73	-	[8]
9	NIT Silchar	NITS	1967	2002	Silchar	Assam	50	97	[9]
10	NIT Allahabad	MNNIT	1961	2002	Prayagraj	Uttar Pradesh	62	-	[10]
11	NIT Surat	SVNIT	1961	2002	Surat	Gujarat	66	-	[11]
12	NIT Calicut	NITC	1961	2002	Kozhikode	Kerala	21	45	[12]
13	NIT Rourkela	NITR	1961	2002	Rourkela	Odisha	13	34	[13]
14	NIT Jaipur	MNIT	1963	2002	Jaipur	Rajasthan	42	77	[14]
15	NIT Kurukshetra	NITKKR	1963	2002	Kurukshetra	Haryana	85	-	[15]
16	NIT Tiruchirappalli	NITT	1964	2002	Tiruchirappalli	Tamil Nadu	9	30	[16]
17	NIT Hamirpur	NITH	1986	2002	Hamirpur	Himachal Pradesh	97	-	[17]
18	NIT Jalandhar	NITJ	1987	2002	Jalandhar	Punjab	55	-	[18]
19	NIT Patna	NITP	1886	2006	Patna	Bihar	53	-	[19]
20	NIT Raipur	NITRR	1956	2006	Raipur	Chhattisgarh	86	-	[20]
21	NIT Agartala	NITA	1965	2006	Agartala	Tripura	-	-	[21]
22	NIT Arunachal Pradesh	NITAP	2010	2010	Yupia	Arunachal Pradesh	-	-	[22]
23	NIT Delhi	NITD	2010	2010	New Delhi	Delhi	65	-	[23]
24	NIT Goa	NITG	2010	2010	Cuncolim	Goa	-	-	[24]
25	NIT Manipur	NITMN	2010	2010	Imphal	Manipur	-	-	[25]
26	NIT Meghalaya	NITM	2010	2010	Shillong	Meghalaya	83	-	[26]
27	NIT Mizoram	NITMZ	2010	2010	Aizawl	Mizoram	-	-	[27]
28	NIT Nagaland	NITN	2010	2010	Chümoukedima	Nagaland	-	-	[28]
29	NIT Puducherry	NITPY	2010	2010	Karaikal	Puducherry	99	-	[29]
30	NIT Sikkim	NITSKM	2010	2010	Ravangla	Sikkim	-	-	[30]
31	NIT Uttarakhand	NITUK	2010	2010	Srinagar, Uttarakhand	Uttarakhand	-	-	[31]
32	NIT Andhra Pradesh	NITANP	2015	2015	Tadepalligudem	Andhra Pradesh	-	-	[32]

*Although designated as an Institute of National Importance and placed under the governance of the NIT Council through the NITSER Act in 2014, IIEST Shibpur was formally integrated into the NIT Council in 2019.

== Organisational structure ==
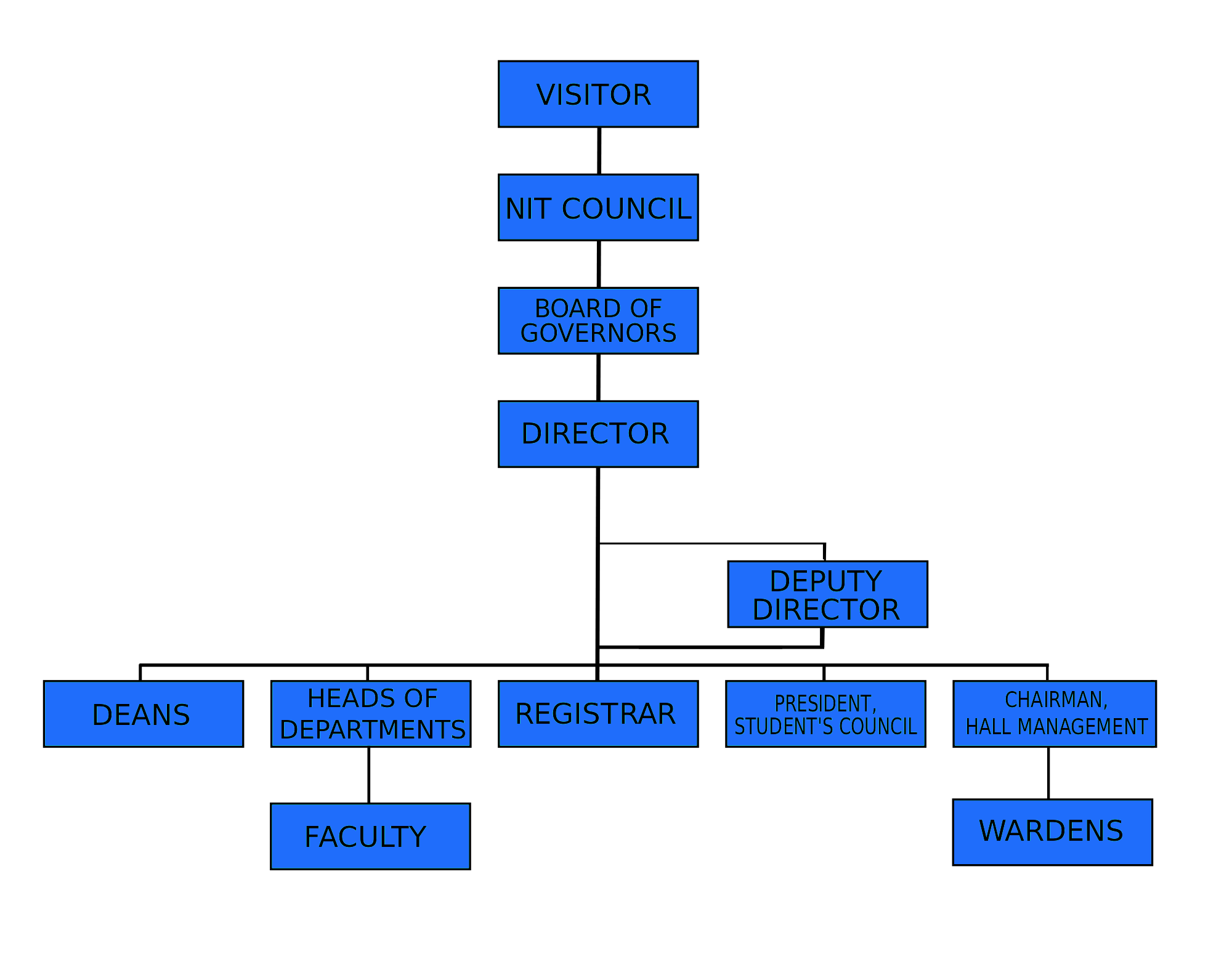
Organisational structure of the NITs

The President of India is the ex officio visitor of all the NITs. The NIT Council works directly under him/her and it includes the minister-in-charge of technical education in Central Government, the chairmen and the Directors of all the NITs, the Chairman of University Grants Commission (UGC), the Director-General of Council of Scientific and Industrial Research (CSIR), the Directors of other selected central institutions of repute, members of Parliament, Joint Council Secretary of Ministry of Human Resource Development (MHRD), nominees of the Central Government, All India Council for Technical Education (AICTE), and the Visitor.

Below the NIT Council is each NIT's Board of Governors. The Board of Governors of each NIT consists of the following members:

- Chairman - an eminent technologist / engineer / educationist to be nominated by the Government of India.
- Member Secretary - Director of the NIT.
- Nominee of the MHRD, Government of India.
- Nominee of the Department of the Higher / Technical Education of the respective state government.
- Head of another technical institution in the region or an eminent technologist to be nominated by Central Govt.
- Director, IIT (in the region) or his nominee.
- Nominee of the UGC not below the rank of a Deputy Secretary.
- Nominee of the AICTE not below the rank of an Advisor.
- An alumnus of the institute from amongst alumni in education/industry to be nominated by Board of Governors.
- Two representatives representing large, medium and small scale industries to be nominated by Central Government.
- One Professor and one assistant professor of the institute by rotation.

The Director serves under the Board of Governors and is the school's chief academic and executive officer. Academic policies are decided by its Senate, which is composed of some professors and other representatives. The Senate controls and approves the curriculum, courses, examinations, and results. Senate committees examine specific academic matters. The teaching, training, and research activities of various departments of the institute are periodically reviewed to maintain educational standards. The Director is the ex officio Chairman of the Senate. The deputy director is subordinate to the Director. Together they manage the Deans, Heads of Departments, Registrar, President of the Students' Council, and Chairman of the Hall Management Committee. Deans and Heads of Departments in NITs are administrative postings rather than career paths. Faculty members serve as Deans and Heads of Departments for limited periods, typically 2 to 3 years, then returning to regular faculty duties. The Registrar is the chief administrative officer and overviews day-to-day operations. Below the Head of Department (HOD), are the various faculty members (professors, assistant professors, and lecturers). The Warden serves under the Chairman of the Hall Management Committee.

== NITSER Act ==
The National Institutes of Technology, Science Education and Research (NITSER) Act, 2007 was enacted by the Parliament of India to declare India's National Institutes of Technology as Institutes of National Importance. The Act received the assent of the President of India on 5 June 2007 and became effective on Independence Day, 2007. The Act is the second law for technical education institutions after the Institutes of Technology Act of 1961.

== Council of NITSER ==
The Council of NITSER is the supreme governing body of India's National Institutes of Technology (NIT) system. The Council of NITSER consists of chairmen, directors of all NITs along with the government nominees from various sectors with the Minister of Education as the chairman of the council. The Council of NITSER is the highest decision-making body in the NIT fraternity and is answerable only to the Government of India. The Council of NITSER is expected to meet regularly and take steps conducive for maximum growth of the NITs as whole in the near future.

== Education ==
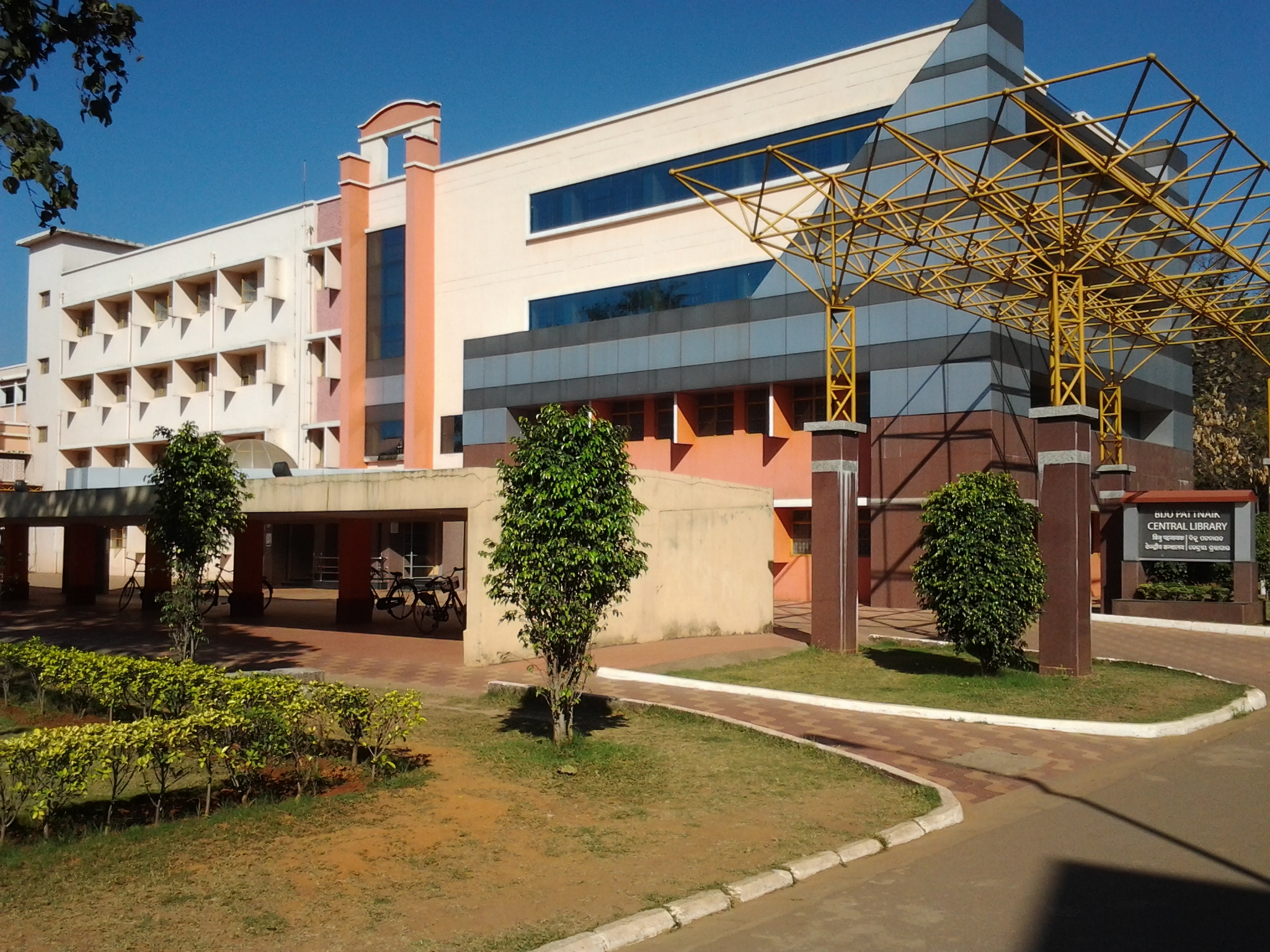
Biju Patnaik Central Library, NIT Rourkela

The NITs along with the IITs receive comparatively higher grants than other engineering colleges in India. Average NIT funding increased to ₹100 crores ($15.4 million) by 2011. On average, each NIT also receives ₹ 20-25 crore ($3-3.8 million) under World Bank funded Technical Education Quality Improvement Programme (TEQIP I and TEQIP II). Other sources of funds include student fees and research funding from industry and contributions from the alumni. The faculty-to-student ratio in the NITs is between 1:7 and 1:9. The cost borne by undergraduate students is around ₹ 250,000 (~$3600) per annum. After students from SC and ST categories, physically challenged students will now be the beneficiaries of fee waiver at the NITs in India.

The various NITs function autonomously, and their special status as Institutes of National Importance facilitates the smooth running of NITs, virtually free from both regional as well as a student politics. Such autonomy means that NITs can create their own curricula and adapt rapidly to the changes in educational requirements, free from bureaucratic hurdles. The medium of instruction in all NITs is English. The classes are usually held between 8:30 am and 5:30 pm, though there are some variations within each NIT. All the NITs have public libraries for the use of their students. In addition to a collection of prescribed books, the libraries have sections for fiction and other literary genres. Electronic libraries allow students access to online journals and other periodicals through the AICTE-INDEST consortium, an initiative by the Ministry of Human Resource Development. Students also have access to IEEE documents and journals.

The academic policies of each NIT are decided by its Senate. This comprises all professors of the NIT and student representatives. Unlike many western universities that have an elected senate, the NITs have an academic senate. It controls and approves the curriculum, courses, examinations and results, and appoints committees to look into specific academic matters. The teaching, training and research activities of the institute are periodically reviewed by the senate to maintain educational standards. The Director of NIT is the ex-officio Chairman of the Senate.

Stringent faculty recruitment and industry collaboration also contribute to NIT success. Faculty other than lecturers must have a DTech and relevant teaching and industry experience. Existing faculty who do not meet these criteria enroll under a Quality Improvement Programme (QIP) at IITs and IISc.

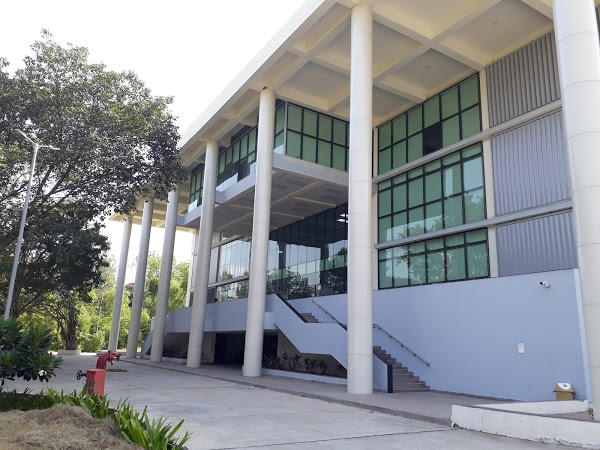
Central Library, NIT Surat

All the NITs follow the credits system of performance evaluation, with a proportional weighting of courses based on their importance. The total marks (usually out of 100) form the basis of grades, with a grade value (out of 10) assigned to a range of marks. Sometimes, relative grading is done considering the overall performance of the whole class. For each semester, the students are graded on a scale of 0 to 10 based on their performance, by taking a weighted average of the grade points from all the courses, with their respective credit points. Each semester evaluation is done independently and then the weighted average overall semesters is used to calculate the cumulative grade point average (CGPA).

=== Undergraduate education ===
The Bachelor of Technology (BTech) degree is the most common undergraduate degree in the NITs in terms of student enrollment. The BTech course is based on a 4-year programme with eight semesters, while the Dual Degree and Integrated courses are 5-year programmes with ten semesters. In all NITs, the first year of BTech and Dual Degree courses are marked by a common course structure for all the students, though in some NITs, a single department introduction related course is also included. The common courses include the basics from most of the departments like electronics, mechanics, chemistry, electrical, and physics. At the end of the first year, some NITs offer an option to the meritorious students to change departments on the basis of their performance in the first two semesters. Few such changes ultimately take place as the criteria for them are usually strict, limited to the most meritorious students. Few NITs also offer 5-year Bachelor of Architecture (BArch) and 4-year Bachelor of Science (BSc) degrees.

From the second year onwards, the students study subjects exclusively from their respective departments. In addition to these, the students have to take compulsory advanced courses from other departments in order to broaden their education. Separate compulsory courses from humanities and social sciences department, and sometimes management courses are also enforced. In the last year of their studies, most of the students are placed into industries and organisations via the placement process of the respective NIT, though some students opt out of this either when going for higher studies or when they take up jobs by applying to the companies directly.

=== Postgraduate and doctoral education ===
==== Master degrees ====
The NITs offer a number of postgraduate programmes including Master of Technology (MTech), Master of Business Administration (MBA), Master of Science (MSc) and Master of Computer Applications (MCA). Some of the NITs offer an M.S. (by research) programme; the MTech and M.S. are similar to the US universities' non-thesis (course-based) and thesis (research-based) masters programmes respectively. Admissions to masters programmes in engineering are made using scores of the Graduate Aptitude Test in Engineering (GATE), while those to masters programmes in science are made using scores of the Joint Admission Test to MSc (JAM).

15 NITs, including NIT Allahabad, NIT Bhopal, IIEST Shibpur, NIT Calicut, NIT Hamirpur, NIT Jaipur, NIT Jalandhar, NIT Kurukshetra, NIT Rourkela, NIT Silchar, NIT Karnataka, NIT Warangal, NIT Durgapur, NIT Tiruchirappalli, and NIT Agartala have separate departments or schools of management offering master's degrees in management or business administration. Additionally, NIT Arunachal Pradesh also offers an Online MBA programme and an M.Tech. in Appropriate Technology and Entrepreneurship, which is perhaps the only one among the NITs.

==== Bachelors-Masters dual degrees ====
The NITs also offer an unconventional BTech and MTech integrated educational programme called "Dual Degree". It integrates undergraduate and postgraduate studies in selected areas of specialisation. It is completed in five years as against six years in conventional BTech (four years) followed by an MTech (two years). Integrated Master of Science programmes is also offered at few NITs which integrates the Undergraduate and Postgraduate studies in Science streams in a single degree programme against the conventional university system. These programmes were started to allow NITians to complete postgraduate studies from NIT rather than having to go to another institute. NIT Rourkela, IIEST Shibpur, SVNIT Surat (NIT Surat)and NIT Agartala have such systems..

==== Doctoral degrees ====
The NITs also offer the Doctor of Technology degree (D.Tech.) as part of their doctoral education programme. In it, the candidates are given a topic of academic interest by the professor or have to work on a consultancy project given by the industries. The duration of the programme is usually unspecified and depends on the specific discipline. DTech candidates have to submit a dissertation as well as provide an oral defence for their thesis. Teaching Assistantships (TA) and Research Assistantships (RA) are often provided. The NITs, along with IITs and IISc, account for nearly 80% of all engineering PhDs in India.

== Campus life ==
NITs provide on-campus housing to students, research scholars, and faculty members. Students live in hostels, also known as halls, throughout their college life.

Faculties and researchers from IITs, ISM and IISc organise occasional technical seminars and research labs.

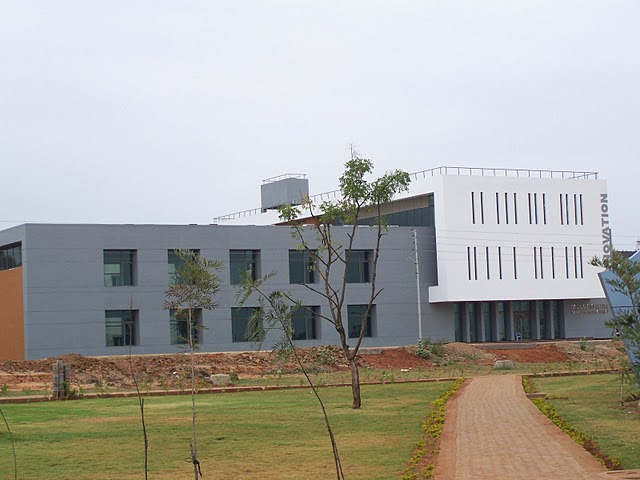
Incubation centre at NIT Warangal

=== Student government ===
Some NITs individually conduct elections to elect student body a general secretary and vice president. These representatives are generally responsible for communicating with the college management and media, organising festivals, and also for various development programmes in their college. Some NITs (such as NIT Rourkela, NIT Surat, IIEST Shibpur and NIT Nagpur) have recently adopted online voting process. The committee which monitors the flow of funds has a student body representative. This committee also includes the chairman of board, an MHRD representative, and NIT professors. Due to some disturbance in the voting process, student elections were stopped in 2008 in SVNIT, Surat. They were, however, resumed in 2015 and are continuing hence.

=== Disciplinary committee ===
The Disciplinary Committee (DISCO) consists of the Director, the student affairs officer, and professors. and reports to MHRD. DISCO regulates student activities and combats student harassment and illegitimate student politics. After a series of harassment incidents, all NITs took strict measures especially to protect first-year students.

=== Extra-curricular activities ===
Popular extra curricular activities include National Cadet Corps (NCC), National Service Scheme (NSS), Indian Society for Technical Education (ISTE), and annual college festivities. Students at NITs run hobby clubs such as Linux User Groups (LUGs), music clubs, debate clubs, literary clubs, and web design teams. Students also publish campus magazines which showcase student creativity and journalism. The first Linux User group in India, Bharat Linux User Group, was formed in early 1997 at NIT Surat (SVNIT). Students conduct regular quizzes and cultural programmes. They also present research papers and participate in national level technical festivals at IITs, IISc and NITs. Most NITs promote entrepreneurship by creating on-campus incubation centers under the STEP programme.

=== Technical and cultural festivals ===
All NITs organise annual technical festivals, typically lasting three or four days. The technical festivals are Avishkar (NIT Allahabad), Technosearch (NIT Bhopal), Tathva (NIT Calicut), Terratechnica (NIT Delhi), One of oldest "Rebeca" (IIEST Shibpur), Gyanith (NIT Puducherry), Aarohan (NIT Durgapur), Nimbus (NIT Hamirpur), Sphinx (NIT Jaipur), TechNITi (NIT Jalandhar), Ojass (NIT Jamshedpur), Techspardha (NIT Kurukshetra), AXIS (NIT Nagpur), Corona (NIT Patna), Aavartan (NIT Raipur), Innovision (NIT Rourkela), Tecnoesis (NIT Silchar), Techvaganza (NIT Srinagar), MindBend (NIT Surat), Engineer (NIT Karnataka), Pragyan (NIT Tiruchirappalli), Technozion (NIT Warangal), Technival (NIT Goa), Morphosis (NIT Mizoram), Cognitia (NIT Meghalaya), Technovya (NIT Nagaland), Addovedi (NIT Arunachal Pradesh), AAYAM (NIT Agartala), Cliffesto (NIT Uttarakhand), iFESTY (NIT Thanjavur), ANVESH (NIT Kundli) and Abhiyantran (NIT Sikkim). Most of them are organised in the months of January or March. Pragyan (NIT Tiruchirappalli) the first student-run organisation in the world and the third overall next only to London 2012 Summer Olympics and Manchester United to get an ISO 20121:2012 Certification for Sustainable Event Management. It is also the largest in terms of Sponsorship amounts and also branded as a techno-management festival due to its emphasis on both technology and management.

== Alumni ==
Many NIT alumni have achieved leading positions in corporations, such as:

- Natarajan Chandrasekaran (chairman, Tata Sons)
- Rajesh Gopinathan (CEO, Tata Consultancy Services)
- T. V. Narendran (CEO, Tata Steel)
- C. P. Gurnani (CEO, Mahindra Satyam)
- K. V. Kamath (Chief, BRICS New Development Bank, Shanghai; Former CEO of ICICI Bank; Padma Bhushan Awardee)
- Srini Raju (chairman, Peepul Capital, iLabs VCF, Former CEO of Cognizant Technology Solutions & Satyam)
- K. R. Sridhar (Founder and CEO, Bloom Energy)
- Shyam Srinivasan (CEO and MD, Federal Bank)
- Abid Ali Neemuchwala (Former CEO of Wipro)
- Sudhir Vasudeva (Former Chairman & MD at ONGC)
- Dinesh Keskar (Senior VP, Boeing Aircraft Trading and Head Boeing India)
- Rao Remala (First Indian employee of Microsoft)
- Rajeev Madhavan (Founder, Magma Design Automation, venture capitalist in USA. on the Dean's advisory board at UCLA's Henry Samueli School of Engineering)
- Pawan Munjal (chairman, MD & CEO, Hero Motocorp)

NIT alumni have also pursued careers in public service; for example:

- Kavuri Samba Siva Rao (Former Union Minister, Ministry of Textiles, Government of India)
- Vinod Kumar Yadav (Chairman of Indian Railways Board)
- Deepak Khandekar (Chief Secretary, Ministry of Tribal Affairs)
- Thomas Abraham (Chairman of the Global Organization of People of Indian Origin, coined the term PIO)
- Dawood Danesh Jafari (Minister of Finance & Economic Affairs, Iran)
- Ajit Jogi (First chief minister of Chhattisgarh also a former lecturer at National Institute of Technology Raipur)
- Sanjiv Chaturvedi (IFS officer who has exposed many corruption cases in Haryana and AIIMS; received the Presidential reference a record four times and the Ramon Magsaysay award in 2015)
- Deep Joshi (Recipient of Magsaysay award & Padma Shri, Social activist, founder of PRADAN (NGO))
- Hemant Karkare (Chief, Mumbai Anti-Terrorist Squad (ATS), martyred during the November 2008 Mumbai Terrorist Attacks)
- Nitish Kumar (Chief minister of Bihar)
- V. V. Lakshminarayana (Former Joint Director for India's Central Bureau of Investigation)
- Suresh Pachouri (Member of Parliament)
- Ram Vinay Shahi (Longest-serving power secretary of India)
- Abhishek Singh (Member of Parliament from Rajnandgaon Region)
- Vivek Shukla (Head- HR, Stelmec Limited, Maharashtra)
- Prafulla Kumar Das (Engineer-in-chief, Odisha (Retd.))
- Balram Singh Yadav (Chief Engineer, Irrigation Department, Uttar Pradesh)
- Malli Mastan Babu (Mountaineer and Motivational speaker, Andhra Pradesh)
- Sonam Wangchuk (Engineer, Innovator and Education reformist)
- Mansoor Ali Khan (Member of the 13th Lok Sabha)
- Budhaditya Mukherjee (Padma Shri recipient and first artist in history to perform in the House of Commons, London)
- Palanivel Thiagarajan (Minister of Finance and Human Resources, Tamil Nadu)

Notable alumni in academics and research include:

- Madhavan Swaminathan (Professor, Georgia Institute of Technology)
- Guruswami Ravichandran (Recipient of 2013 Eringen Medal and Chair of Engineering Division, California Institute of Technology)
- Nambirajan Seshadri (Recipient of 2018 IEEE Alexander Graham Bell Medal and Professor of Practice, University of California, San Diego)
- Anindya Ghose (Professor, New York University Stern School of Business)
- Rajkumar Chellaraj (CFO and Associate Dean, Stanford Graduate School of Business, Stanford University)
- Avinash Kumar Agarwal (mechanical engineer, Shanti Swarup Bhatnagar laureate)
- Akhilesh K. Gaharwar (Professor, Texas A&M University)
- Siva S. Banda (Director of the Control Science Center of Excellence and Chief Scientist for the Aerospace Systems Directorate at the United States Air Force Research Laboratory at Wright-Patterson Air Force Base)
- Lalit Goel (Professor and Head of Electrical Engineering, Nanyang Technological University)
- Baldev Raj (Padma Shri awardee, former director of the Indira Gandhi Centre for Atomic Research, currently the Chairman of Board of Governors at National Institute of Technology Puducherry)
- B. N. Singh (Chairman of ICTACEM, Professor & Dean of Human Resource, Indian Institute of Technology Kharagpur)
- Vallabh Sambamurthy (Dean of the Wisconsin School of Business, University of Wisconsin, Madison)
- Onkar Singh (Founder Vice Chancellor of Madan Mohan Malaviya University of Technology)
- Dharma Agrawal (Distinguished Professor of Electrical Engineering and Computing Systems at the University of Cincinnati)

== See also ==
- Institutes of National Importance
