= National Institute of Technology, Manipur =

Engineering institution in Manipur, India

- Other name: NITM
- Type: Public
- Established: 2010; 16 years ago
- Affiliations: NIT
- Chairman: Bajrang Lal Bagra
- Director: Dr. D. V. L. N. Somayajulu
- Academic staff: 100
- Students: 500+
- Location: Imphal, Manipur, India
- Campus: Urban
- Website: www.nitmanipur.ac.in

National Institute of Technology Manipur (NIT Manipur or NITMN) is an Institute of National Importance situated in Imphal, Manipur, India. It is one of the 31 National Institutes of Technology in India. NIT Manipur started its first academic session in 2010.

== History ==
The institute is one among the thirty-one NITs established as Institutions of National Importance with funding support from the Ministry of Human Resource Development. It is also one of ten new NITs established by the Ministry of Human Resource Development via its order no. F.23-13-2009-TS-III of 30 October 2009 and 3 March 2010. NIT Manipur was declared as a full-fledged NIT along with nine other new NITs, through an act of Parliament and notified under Govt. of India Gazette notification No. 28 of 2012 dated 7 June 2012 and declared as an Institute of National Importance.

== Campus ==
NIT Manipur is located at RWJ7+R33, Langol Rd, Lamphelpat, Imphal, Manipur 795004

== Academics ==
=== Ranking ===
University rankings

Engineering – India
- NIRF (2022): 95
- NIRF (2023): 127
- NIRF (2024): 129

NIT Manipur is ranked among all engineering colleges in India and the last 5 amongst the 31 NITs across the country by the National Institutional Ranking Framework (NIRF) in 2023. It also stood as one of the last ones in the eleven new NITs alongside NIT Delhi, NIT Meghalaya and NIT Goa in 2023, but in 2024 it has been delegated to the range of 100-150 rank.

Year	NIRF Ranking (Engineering Category)
2024	101-150
2023	95
2022	108
2021	114
2020	158
2019	148

=== Academic programmes ===
The institute offers courses on BTech and MTech in civil engineering, computer science engineering, electrical engineering, electronics and communication engineering and mechanical engineering. In addition, it offers MSc courses in physics, chemistry and mathematics. PhD courses also exist for various engineering, science and humanities subjects. NIT Manipur's curriculum caters to the technological needs of nearby villages and towns.

=== Admission ===
Bachelor of Technology (B.Tech) and admissions for Indian students are through JOSAA counselling, where 50% of the seat is reserved for students who did their 12th from the state of Manipur.

=== Departments ===
The institute has nine academic departments:

- Computer Science and Engineering (
- Civil Engineering
- Electrical Engineering
- Electronics and Communication Engineering
- Mechanical Engineering
- Physics
- Chemistry
- Mathematics
- Humanities and Social Sciences

== Student life ==
=== Festival ===
OUGRI the cultural and technical festival which USED to be organized every year, (but has not been organized since 2022) in the month of March (spring). It was a student-organized festival guided by a faculty member or a group of coordinating body of faculties. It was first organized in 2013. The term ‘OUGRI’ is derived from the name of the song sung at the coronation of Nongda Lairen Pakhangba in 33 A.D. The song is also known as Leiroi Nongloi Eshei. And this song is being noted as the very core of the Lai Haraoba festival where the people re-enacting the acts of the Almighty and other divine beings believing that their pleasure is evoked and in return the mortals on the earth are blessed with happiness and prosperity. Many kings and priests sing this song or accompanying with dance on numerous occasions celebrating their conquests, coronation and prosperity.

=== Sports ===
NITMN organizes an annual sports meet usually in March. Football, kabaddi and volleyball are the major attractions. Table tennis, chess, carrom, 100 m 200 m 400 m and 800 m races are also hosted, mostly by some groups of students on their own accord, the institute does not organize any events.
