= National Institute of Technology, Sikkim =

Public engineering institution in India

- Motto in English: Move on
- Type: Public engineering school (INI)
- Established: August 2010; 16 years ago
- Affiliations: UGC, MoE, AICTE
- Chairperson: Ramesh Kumar Saraogi
- Director: Mahesh Chandra Govil
- Location: Ravangla, Sikkim, India; 27.297505°N 88.357221°E
- Language: English
- Website: www.nitsikkim.ac.in

National Institute of Technology Sikkim (NIT Sikkim or NIT SKM) is a public engineering and research institution near the city of Ravangla in Sikkim, India. It is one of the 31 National Institutes of Technology in India and has been declared as an Institute of National Importance by the Government of India. It is an autonomous institute and functioning under the aegis of Ministry of Education, Government of India.

== History ==
National Institute of Technology, Sikkim is one among the ten newly sanctioned National Institutes of Technology by the Government of India under the 11th Five year Plan, 2009. NIT Sikkim started functioning in August, 2010.

== Campus ==
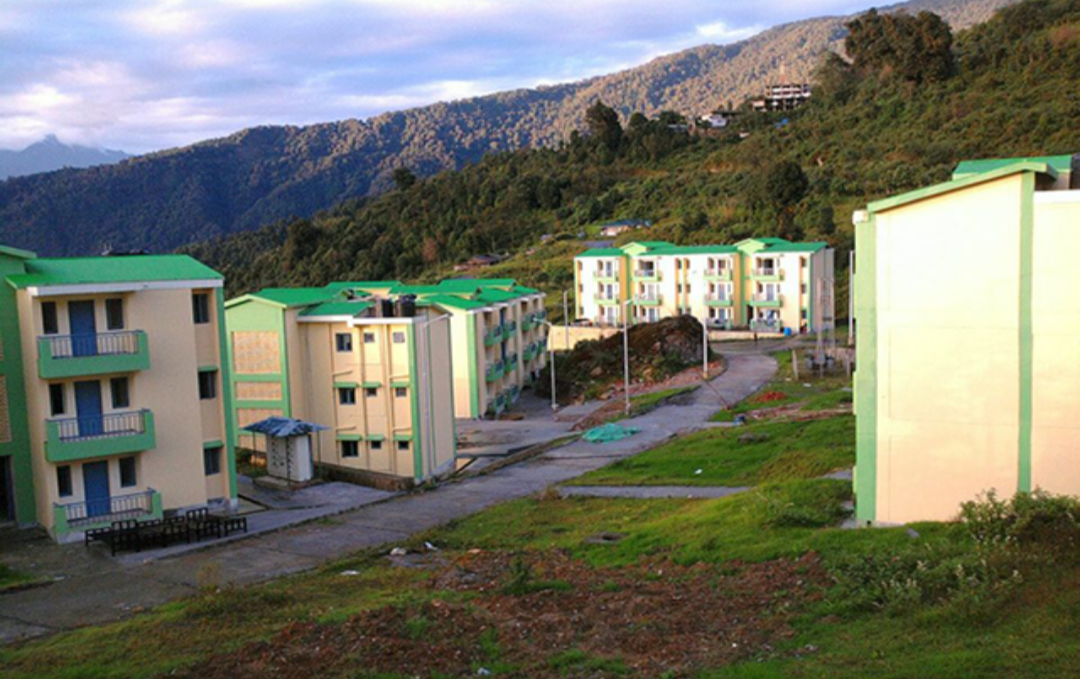
NIT, Sikkim

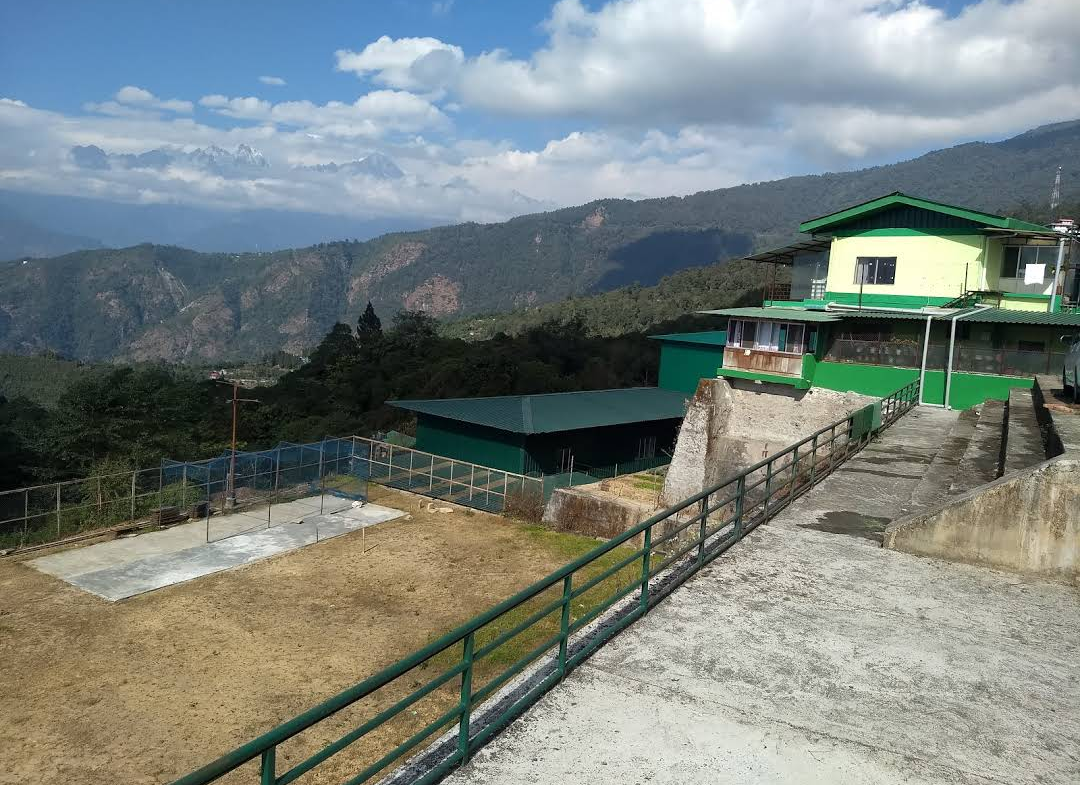
NIT, Sikkim

As of February 2026, the institute operates from its temporary campus at Ravangla. Construction of the permanent campus at Khamdong, Sikkim, is underway. Official reports indicate a scheduled date of completion of December 2026.. Local news reports and on the ground account suggest that completion is more likely to occur between August to December 2027.

The permanent campus is being built at Dungdung, Khamdong, East Sikkim, across a 50-acre footprint. Executed by NBCC (India) Ltd. as a turnkey ₹547 Crore EPC mega-project. The core infrastructure features academic and administrative complexes, heavy engineering workshops with dedicated structural trusses, a multi-level Student Activity Center, and residential zones, including a first-year hostel.

== Academics ==
All courses and examinations are conducted in the English language as the only mode of instruction. NIT Sikkim offers a 4-year Bachelor of Technology (B.Tech.) programme in various engineering fields, as well as a 2-year Master of Technology (M.Tech.) programme and Ph.D. Programmes. Admission to undergraduate programmes is taken through JEE (Main). Admission to the postgraduate courses is through the GATE for Master of Technology (M.Tech.).

=== Ranking ===
University rankings

Engineering – India
- NIRF (2024): 151-200

NIT Sikkim is ranked between 151-200 among the engineering colleges of India by National Institutional Ranking Framework (NIRF) in 2024.

== Departments ==
Academic departments include:

Engineering

- Department of Civil Engineering
- Department of Computer Science and Engineering
- Department of Electrical and Electronics Engineering
- Department of Electronics and Communication Engineering
- Department of Mechanical Engineering

Sciences

- Department of Chemistry
- Department of Physics
- Department of Mathematics

Allied departments

- Department of Humanities and Social Sciences

== Campus facilities ==
Currently, it is operating from a temporary campus at Ravangla.

=== PARAM Kanchenjunga supercomputer ===
NIT Sikkim is home to PARAM Kanchenjunga, one of the PARAM series of supercomputers. Unveiled in April 2016, it is the fastest supercomputer among NITs. Costing ₹3 crore (US$310,000), it was built with collaboration of Centre for Development of Advanced Computing (C-DAC).

=== Library ===
The institute has a central library that caters to all the academic needs of students. The library also subscribes to several scientific journals and magazines.

=== Internet accessibility ===
The institute is part of the multi-gigabit National Knowledge Network (NKN), a National research and education network. The academic buildings are all Wi-Fi enabled and they are connected through high-speed LAN too. All the labs are also connected to the internet through high-speed LAN. Almost all hostels are provided with internet facility through Wi-Fi or LAN and other hostels will also be provided in the near future.

=== Auditorium ===
An Auditorium is inside the campus for important occasions and cultural events.

=== Hostels ===
The Institute provides boarding facilities to the students and the faculty members on the campus. The Institute provides separate hostels for the male and female students with separate mess facilities.

=== Sports ===
The institute has playgrounds with facilities for playing cricket, football, volleyball etc. It also has facilities to play badminton, table tennis, etc. The institution also hosts a number of intra-sports tournaments for its students which are handled by the student body of NIT Sikkim.

- Sports Week provides an opportunity for the students to participate in inter-department volleyball, football, table-tennis, badminton, chess and kho-kho tournaments as well as athletic events.
- Xplode Cricket Cup' is the annual intra-NIT cricket tournament.

== Student activities ==
Extracurricular activities include an innovation cell, the community development society Aayas, the mechanical engineer's society Yantrikaa, the Illuzion dance club and the photography club.

NIT Sikkim students also hold an annual technology festival (fest) called Abhiyantran which was held for the first time in 2014, and a three-day socio-cultural fest called Udgam.

== See also ==
- National Institutes of Technology
- Ministry of Education(Shiksha Mantralaya)
- Sikkim
