= Joint Admission Test for Masters =

All India entrance test, jointly conducted by IITs

- Official logo of JAM 2027
- Acronym: JAM
- Type: Computer-Based Test (CBT)
- Administrator: Conducted jointly by the Indian Institutes of Technology (IITs) and the Indian Institute of Science (IISc), on behalf of the Ministry of Education (MoE), Government of India
- Skills tested: Physics, Chemistry, Mathematics, Mathematical Statistics, Biotechnology, Geology, Economics
- Purpose: Admission to M.Sc., Joint M.Sc.–Ph.D., and other postgraduate science programmes
- Year started: 2004
- Duration: 3 hours
- Score range: Varies by paper (AIR-based ranking)
- Score validity: 1 year
- Offered: Once a year (February)
- Restrictions on attempts: No age limit; no attempt limit
- Regions: India (multiple test cities nationwide)
- Languages: English
- Annual number of test takers: ~60,000–70,000 annually
- Prerequisites: Bachelor's degree (B.Sc./B.Tech./equivalent)
- Fee: INR ₹1000 (Single Paper) & ₹1350 (Double Papers) for Female (All Categories) / SC / ST / PwD. INR ₹2000 (Single Paper) & ₹2700 (Double Papers) for all other categories (JAM 2026)
- Used by: IITs, IISc, NITs, IIEST Shibpur, IISERs, and other CFTIs
- Qualification rate: Varies (~15–20% qualify typically)
- Website: jam.iitkgp.ac.in (JAM 2027)
- Conducting institute changes every year among IITs

The Joint Admission Test for Masters (JAM) is a common admission test conducted every year for admission into Master of Science (M.Sc.) and other post-graduate science programs at Indian Institutes of Technology (IITs), Indian Institute of Science (IISc), Indian Institutes of Information Technology (IIITs) and National Institutes of Technology (NITs), organized by alternating institutes every year. JAM has been conducted since 2004. The 2021 edition was organized by Indian Institute of Science. JAM 2022, 2023 and 2024 was organized by Indian Institute of Technology Roorkee, Indian Institute of Technology Guwahati and Indian Institute of Technology Madras respectively. JAM 2025 was organized by Indian Institute of Technology Delhi.

== Eligibility ==
As of 2022, the eligibility criteria for JAM include having a bachelor's degree. There is no percentage criteria to apply for the exam. The Foreign candidates can also apply for the JAM Exam after having a qualifying degree with the Minimum Educational Qualifications (MEQs) as specified by the Admitting Institute.

=== Notes ===
a) It is responsibility of the candidates to prove that they satisfy the Minimum Educational Qualifications (MEQs) and Eligibility Requirements (ERs) for admission.
b) The Admitting Institute has the right to cancel, at any stage, the admission of candidates who are found to have been admitted to a Programme to which they are not entitled, being unqualified or ineligible in accordance with the rules and regulations in effect.

== Exam pattern ==
The exam is Computer Based Test (CBT). The Seven Papers of respective subject namely mathematics, physics, chemistry, mathematical statistics, geology, biotechnology and economics. Biological science was removed in 2020 and economics introduced in 2021. The exam is three hours and is conducted only in English. It includes 60 questions, as follows: 30 multiple choice questions (MCQ - involving 10 questions of one mark each and 20 questions of two marks each), 10 multiple select questions (MSQ) and 20 numerical answer type (NAT) questions. Total marks are 100, 50 for MCQ, 20 for MSQ and 30 for NAT. Negative marks are given for mistakes in the MCQ part.
