= National Institute of Technology, Andhra Pradesh =

Public technical university in India

- Other name: NIT ANP
- Type: Public technical university
- Established: September 2015; 10 years ago
- Accreditation: Institute of National Importance
- Affiliations: Ministry of Education (India)
- Chairman: Vacant
- Director: N. V. Ramana Rao (I/C)
- Academic staff: 180
- Administrative staff: 240
- Students: 2,500+
- Postgraduates: 450+
- Doctoral students: 210+
- Location: Tadepalligudem, Andhra Pradesh, 534101, India
- Campus: Approx.172.6 Acres; Urban
- Website: nitandhra.ac.in/main/

National Institute of Technology Andhra Pradesh (NIT ANP) is a public technical university and the 31st NIT established by the Government of India. It was founded in the academic year 2015–16 in Tadepalligudem (West Godavari District), Andhra Pradesh. The institute is recognized by the Government of India (as an Institute of National Importance) and currently offers undergraduate (B.Tech.), postgraduate (M.Tech.) and doctoral (Ph.D.) programs.

== Academics ==
Undergraduate (B.Tech.) – Admissions are based on the JEE (Mains) exam through the central JoSAA/CSAB counselling process.

B.Tech. degrees are offered in eight engineering branches:

1. Biotechnology
2. Chemical Engineering
3. Civil Engineering
4. Computer Science & Engineering
5. Electrical & Electronics Engineering
6. Electronics & Communication Engineering
7. Mechanical Engineering
8. Metallurgical & Materials Engineering.

In each branch, 50% of the seats are reserved for students from Andhra Pradesh (home state) and 50% for students from other states.

Postgraduate (M.Tech.) – The institute offers M.Tech. programs in specialized fields. Current M.Tech. specializations include:

1. Bioprocess Engineering (Biotechnology)
2. Chemical Engineering
3. Geotechnical Engineering (Civil)
4. Computer Science & Data Analytics
5. Power Electronics & Drives (Electrical)
6. Advanced Communication Systems & Signal Processing (Electronics)
7. Manufacturing Engineering, and Thermal Engineering (Mechanical).

(Admissions follow the national CCMT counseling based on GATE scores.)

Research (M.S & Ph.D.) – NIT Andhra also offers research degrees. Both M.S (by Research) and Ph.D. programs are available (full-time and part-time) across its departments. These include all major engineering departments:

1. Biotechnology
2. Chemical
3. Civil
4. Computer Science
5. Electrical
6. ECE
7. Mechanical
8. Metallurgical & Materials and the School of Sciences and Humanities (Mathematics, Physics, Chemistry, English, Management).

== Student Life and Facilities ==
=== Hostel and Dining ===
NIT Andhra has Ten Boys and Five Girls hostels with an accommodation capacity of about 2,000 students. The first years have a four-seater room, second and third years have two seater and fourth years have single seater rooms.

Hostels

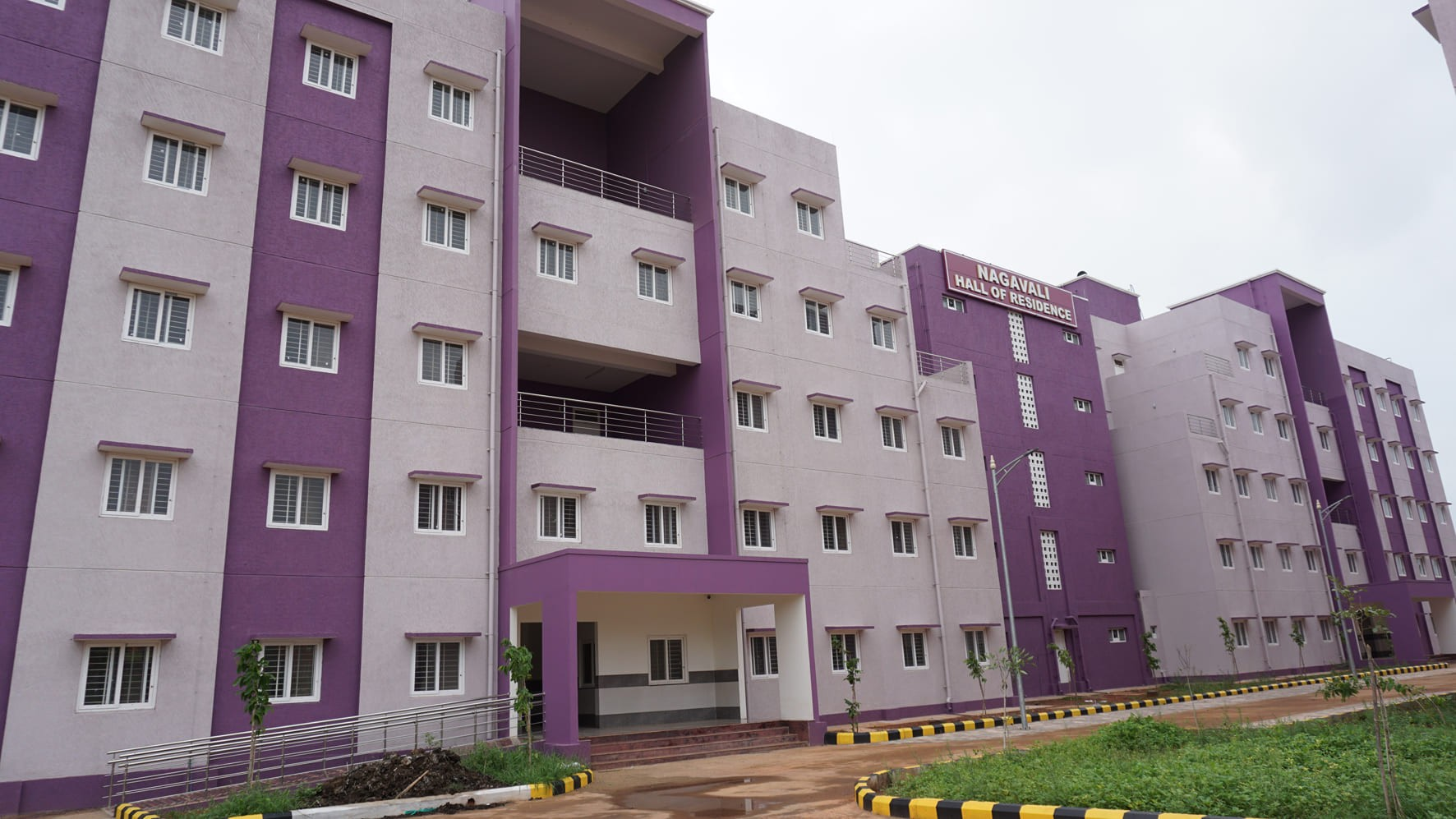

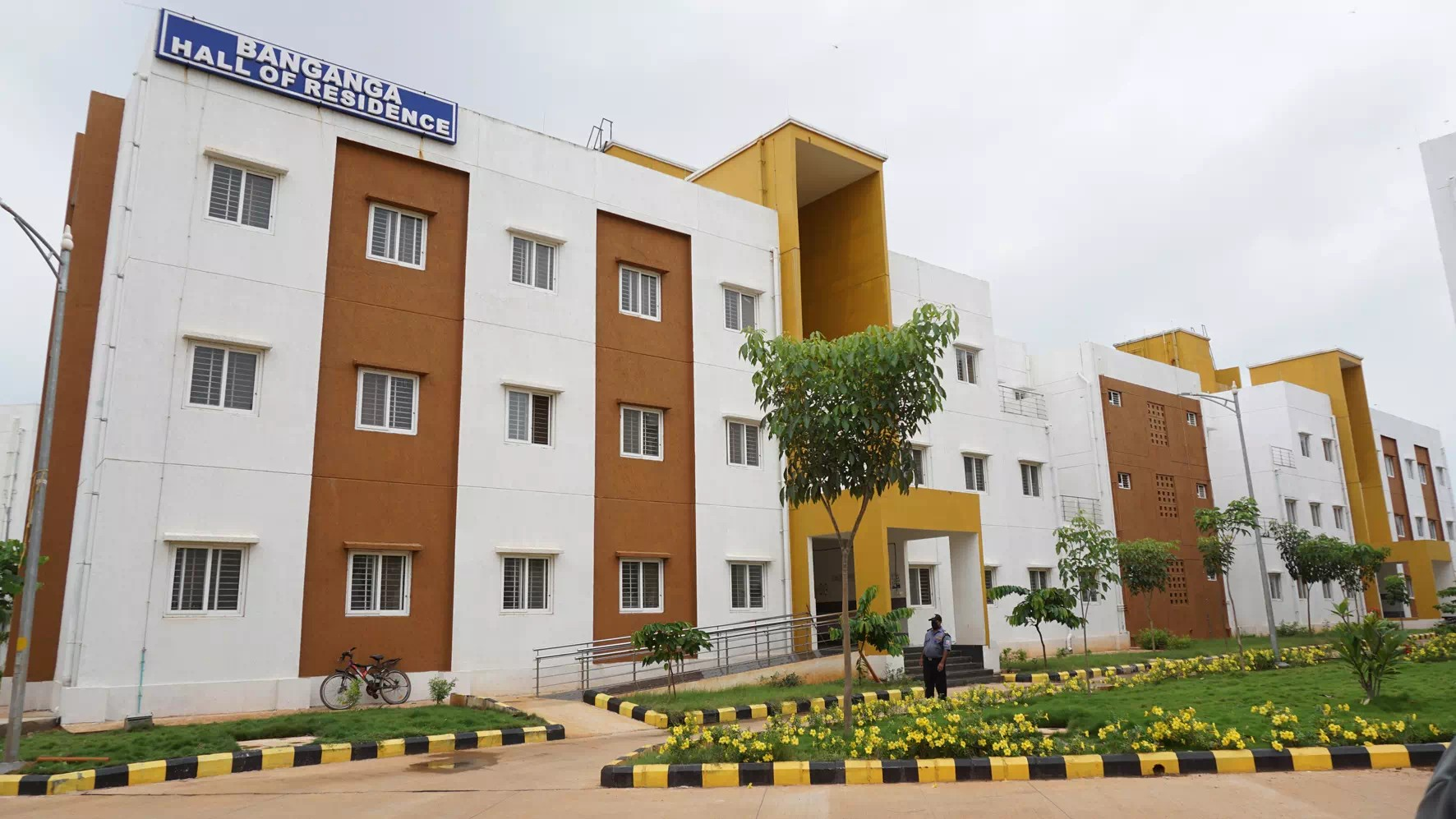

There are two messes for boys and one mess for Girls hostel to cater the food and other eatables.

Boys Mess:

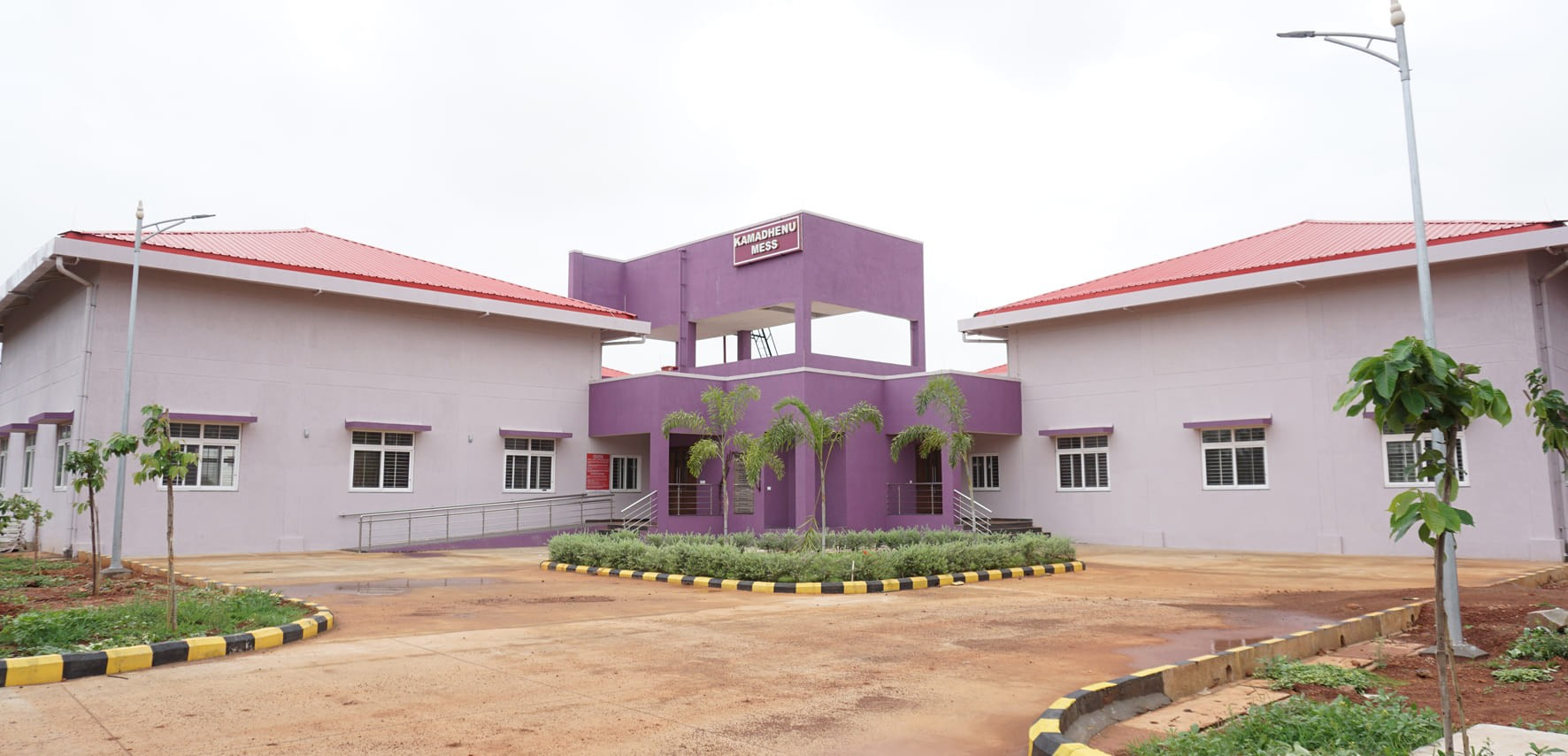

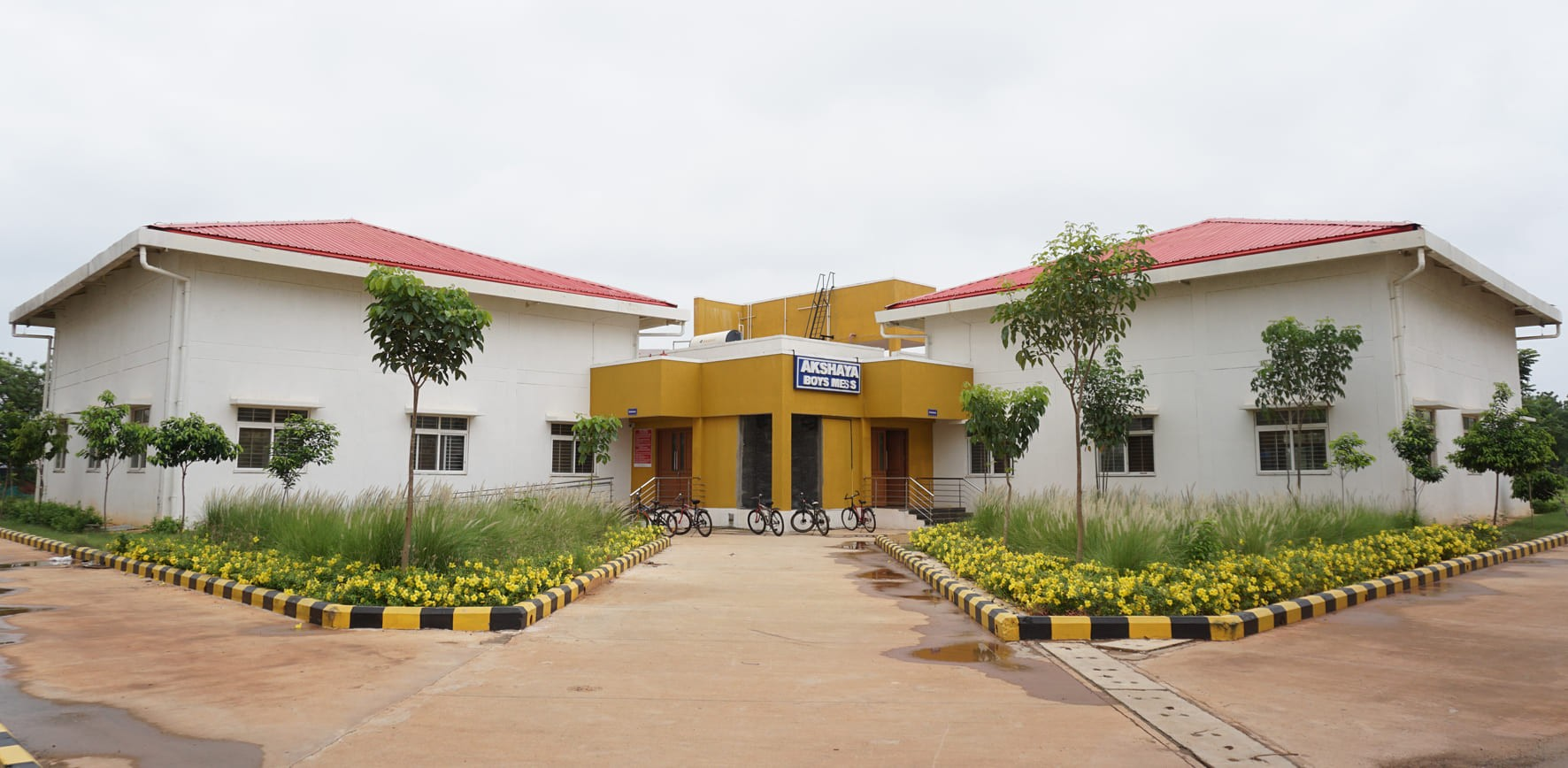

=== Library ===
A central library supports student learning. Services include SC/ST book banks, reference books, CD-ROMs and periodicals, among other academic resources.

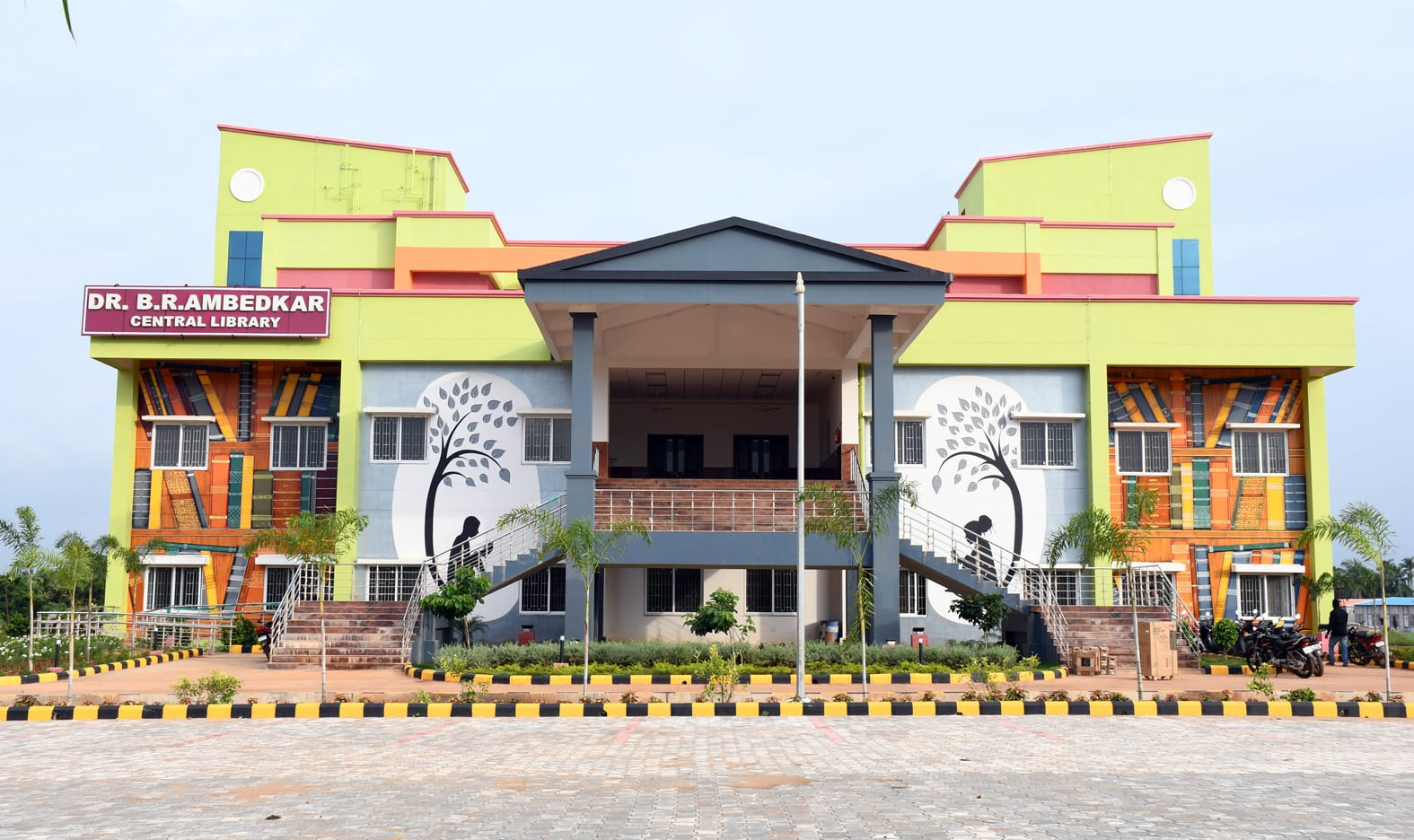

=== Health Centre ===
A health centre is located on campus. It has one full-time medical officer and five paramedical staff to attend to the medical needs of students and staff (with emergency evacuation to nearby hospitals if required).

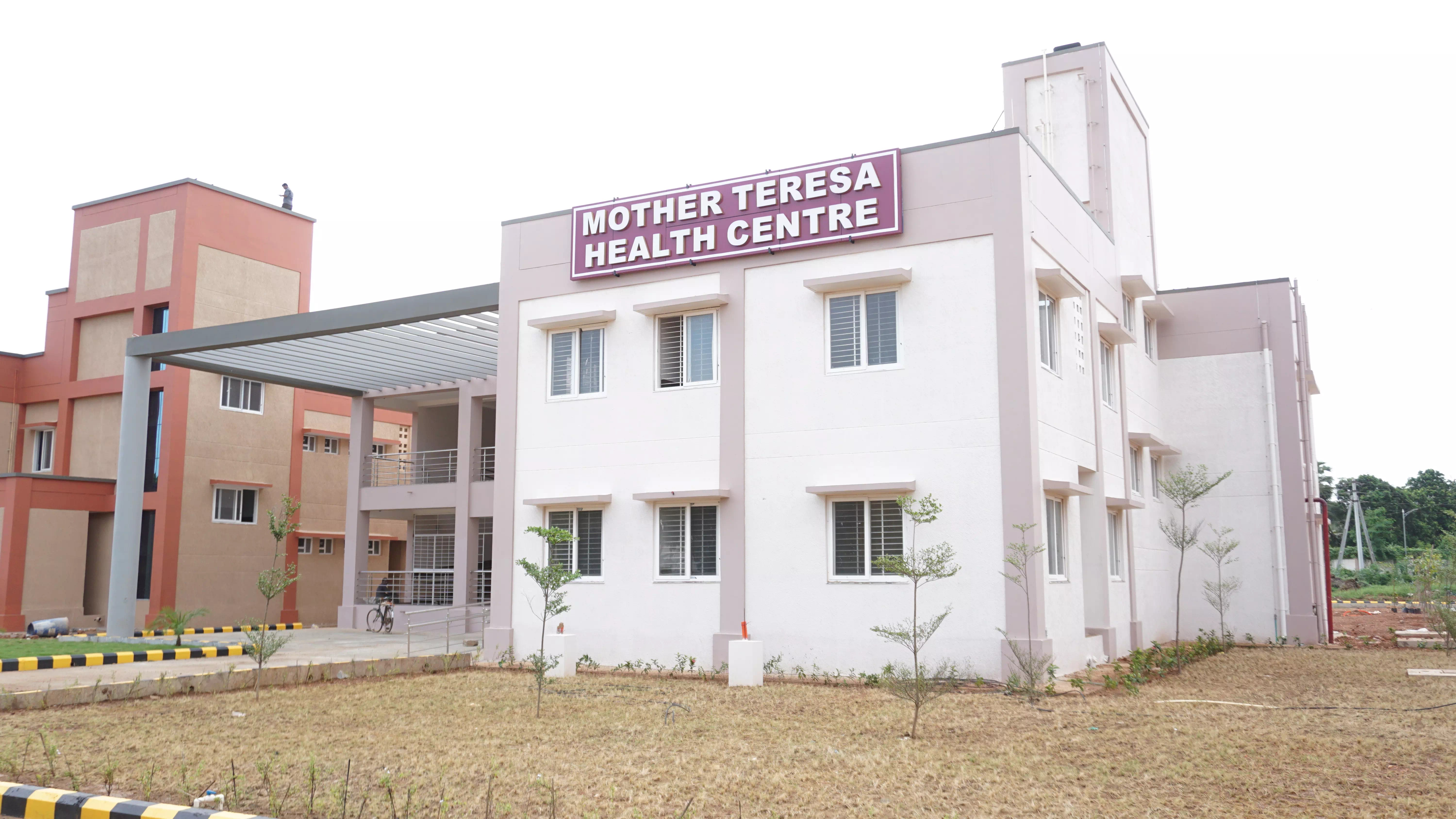

=== Sports ===
The Institute provides ample avenues for the development and nurturing of creative and other talents in the students through Sports Department. The prime bodies under sports department is activity center and Gym, which provide avenues for various sports events, indoor and outdoor games.

Indoor & Outdoor Sports

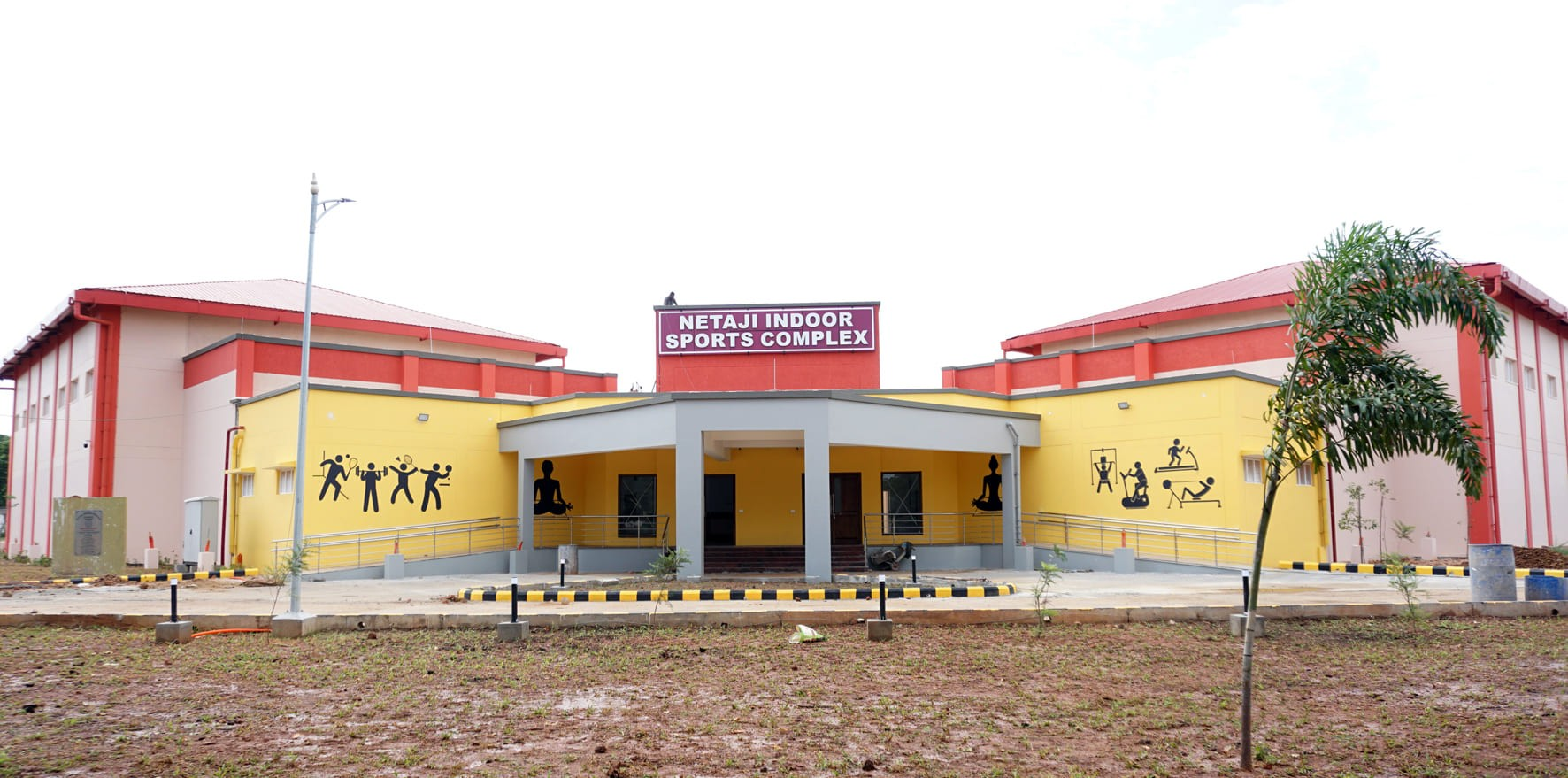

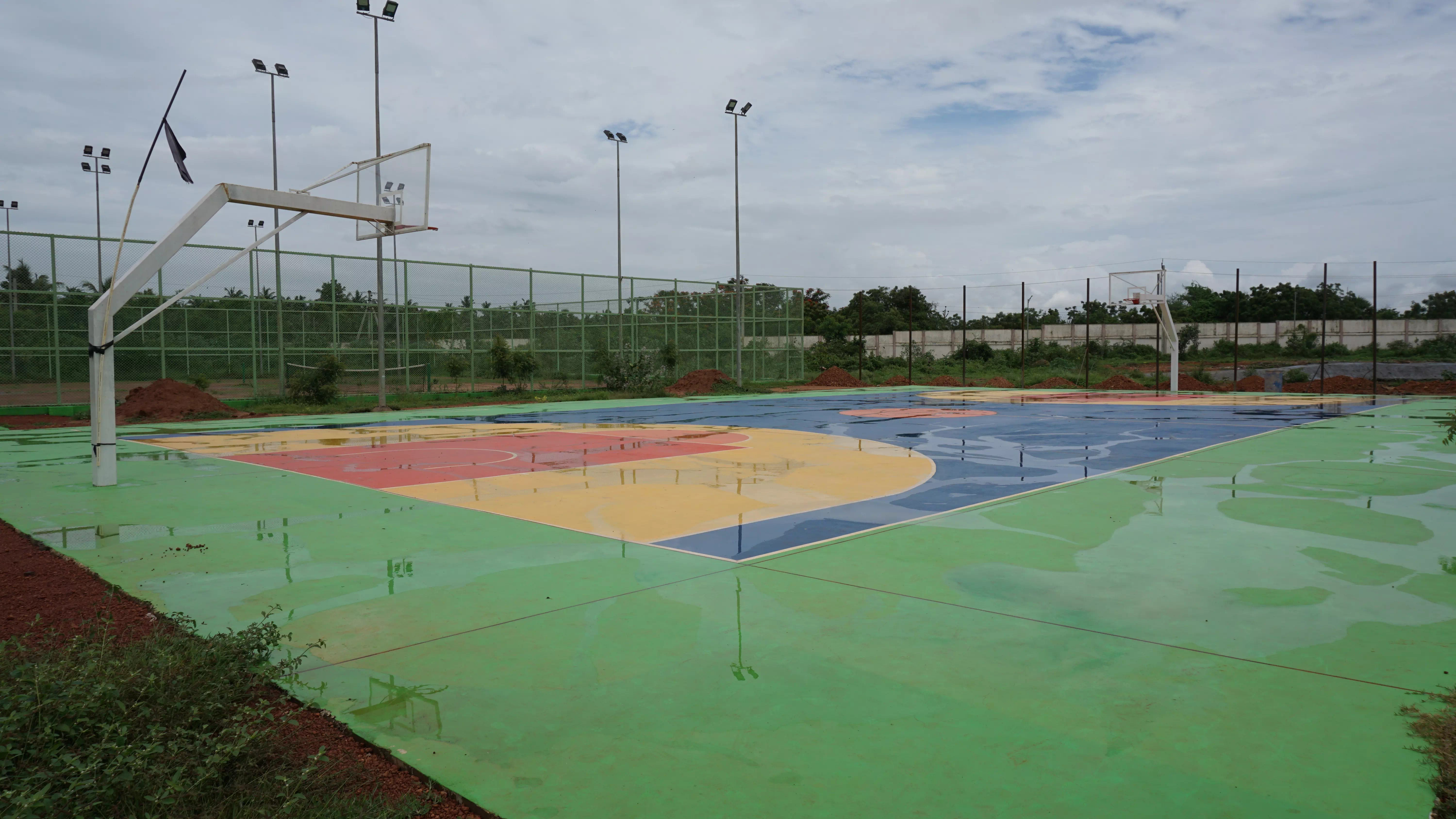

Note: Each of the above facts is confirmed by the institute's official website.

== Training & Placement Cell ==
The institute's Training & Placement Section serves as the interface between the institute and industry. Its stated mission is "Prepare Quality Engineers for Successful Future" and its vision is "To be a nationally recognized organization that attracts, rewards, retains outstanding faculty, students and staff."

Key functions of the cell include:

- Nurturing industry - institute interaction by organising industrial visits, in-plant training and industry‐relevant student projects
- Providing individual career counselling to students to help align their interests and choice of companies
- Maintaining and sharing job-profiles and employer data so that students may choose companies of interest.
- Organising campus placement programmes and forwarding feedback from visiting organisations for curriculum improvement.

Recent placement data from the institute show:

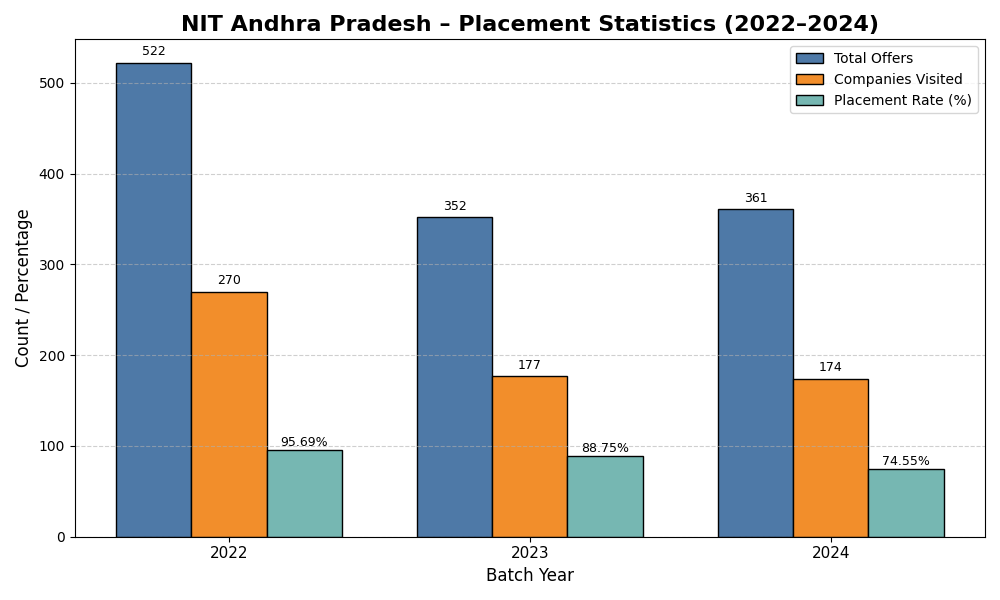

== Ranking ==
National Institute of Technology, Andhra Pradesh was declared as an Institutes of National Importance by the Government of India in 2015. Since it is the youngest NIT among the chain of NITs, it has not been ranked by the National Institutional Ranking Framework yet. The institute has been awarded and recognised as the Best Institute in South India 2021 by the Centre for Education Growth and Research during the 15th Rashtriya Shiksha Gaurav Puraskar Ceremony.

== See also ==
- National Institutes of Technology
- Institutes of National Importance
