= National Institutes of Technology, Science Education and Research Act, 2007 =

Indian law

- Emblem of India

Parliament of India
- Long title: An Act to declare certain institutions of technology, science education and research to be Institutions of national importance and to provide for instructions and research in branches of engineering, technology, management, education, sciences and arts and for the advancement of learning and dissemination of knowledge in such branches and for certain other matters connected with such institutions.
- Citation: Act no. 29 of 2007
- Territorial extent: Whole of India
- Passed by: Lok Sabha
- Passed: 5 June 2007
- Passed by: Rajya Sabha
- Passed: 6 June 2007
- Assented to: 6 June 2007 (by the President of India, APJ Abdul Kalam)
- Commenced: 15 August 2007
- Effective: 15 August 2007

Legislative history

Initiating chamber: Lok Sabha
- Bill title: The National Institutes of Technology Bill, 2007
- Introduced by: Murli Manohar Joshi (as Minister of Human Resources Development)
- Introduced: 5 June 2007

Related legislation
- The Delhi University Act, 1922; All India Institute of Medical Sciences Act, 1956; The Institutes of Technology Act, 1961

Summary
- The Act provides further autonomy to National Institutes of Technology, Indian Institute of Engineering Science and Technology and Indian Institutes of Science Education and Research by declaring them as institutions of national importance.
- Status: In force

The National Institutes of Technology, Science Education and Research Act, 2007 (original name: National Institutes of Technology Act, 2007; renamed by amendment of 2012) was enacted by the Parliament of India to declare India's National Institutes of Technology (NITs), Indian Institute of Engineering Science and Technology (IIEST) and Indian Institutes of Science Education and Research (IISERs) as Institutes of National Importance. The former Act received the assent of the President of India on 5 June 2007 and became effective on Independence Day, 2007. The National Institutes of Technology, Science Education and Research Act, 2007 is the second law for technical education institutions after the Indian Institutes of Technology Act, 1961.

NITs, IIEST and IISERs are centrally funded technical institutes in India. This Act declares them as institutions of national importance, along with the lines of the Indian Institutes of Technology (IITs) and makes them eligible for a larger amount of funding and support from the Indian Government. The Act also aims at unifying the organisational structure of the NITs and bringing them under the direct purview of the Ministry of Human Resource Department (MHRD). These institutions were previously governed by individual societies under the Societies Registration Act, 1860.

== Rationale ==
The 17 Regional Engineering Colleges (RECs) (Bhopal, Allahabad, Kozhikode, Durgapur, Hamirpur, Kurukshetra, Jalandhar, Jamshedpur, Jaipur, Nagpur, Rourkela, Silchar, Srinagar, Surathkal, Surat, Tiruchirappalli, and Warangal) were established in the major states of India as a cooperative venture between the central and respective state governments. In 2002, the Indian government decided to upgrade all RECs to NITs and later raised a few other reputed government colleges in subsequent years (namely Patna, Raipur and Agartala) to NIT status.

After the upgrade, NITs were completely under central government control. The Institutes provided potential choice for the government to replicate the IIT system and the Indian government decided to give these institutes more autonomous powers.

== Benefit to the NITs ==
With the NIT Act, the societies governing the NITs ceased to exist and the institutes are placed directly under the administrative control of the HRD ministry with the boards of governors heading affairs. The chairperson of the board is appointed by the President of India, who will also be a visitor to each institute. The ministry will also have a say in the appointment of the Director and Deputy Director of each institute.

The NITs have become a group of disciplined institutions and within few years, they have come a long way, based on the successful and sound foundation of REC system and with the elimination of dual control by state and central government. They have united together and successfully lobbied for Institute of National Importance status under NIT Act of 2007. With the new-found INI status, NITs shall be able to receive increased government funding and support, more freedom to implement various academic programs and increased attention nationally and internationally.

NITs further plan to start NITNET for networking and implement NIT-Vision 2025 to launch ambitious academic and research programs. Individual institutes will be permitted to start new programs catering to the needs of the local industry and wind up unpopular courses. The focus will be on nanotechnology and biotechnology. Plans are afoot to start integrated courses in science and technology along with dual degree programs both at undergraduate and postgraduate levels.

NITs have been told to increase the student intake in the next five years, with the number of students being doubled to that of the existing strength. The MHRD Ministry plans to increase the number of the research fellowships, with as many as 60 to 70 being granted to each institute to enable students to concentrate on new topics of interest. Existing laboratories and libraries will also be upgraded.

== Amendments ==
The National Institutes of Technology, Science Education and Research (Amendment) Bill, 2016 was introduced in Lok Sabha by Prakash Javadekar, Minister of Human Resource Development, on 19 July 2016 to bring NIT in Andhra Pradesh under this act. It was passed by Lok Sabha on 21 July 2016 and Rajya Sabha on 1 August 2016.
