= Indian Institute of Information Technology, Manipur =

Institute in Senapati district, Manipur

Coordinates: 24.843°N 93.938°E

Indian Institute of Information Technology Senapati, Manipur
- Type: Public-Private Partnership
- Established: 2015 ; 10 years ago
- Affiliations: IIIT
- Director: Krishnan Baskar
- Academic staff: 100
- Students: 1,000+
- Postgraduates: 100+
- Location: Imphal, Manipur, India
- Campus: Urban
- Website: iiitmanipur.ac.in

Indian Institute of Information Technology Senapati, Manipur (IIIT Senapati) is one among the prestigious Indian Institutes of Information Technology, a group of 25 Interdisciplinary Technical Universities of higher education started by the Government of India, focused on Information Technology. It is an "Institute of National Importance", declared by an act of parliament.

On 9 August 2017, The Indian Institutes of Information Technology (Public-Private Partnership) Act, 2017 has been notified in the Gazette of India. The act confers the "Institute Of National Importance" (INI) status on 15 IIITs set up on the public-private partnership (PPP) mode in Vadodara, Guwahati, Sri City, Kota, Tiruchirappalli, Kalyani, Una, Sonepat, Lucknow, Kottayam, Manipur, Dharwad, Pune, Nagpur, and Ranchi.

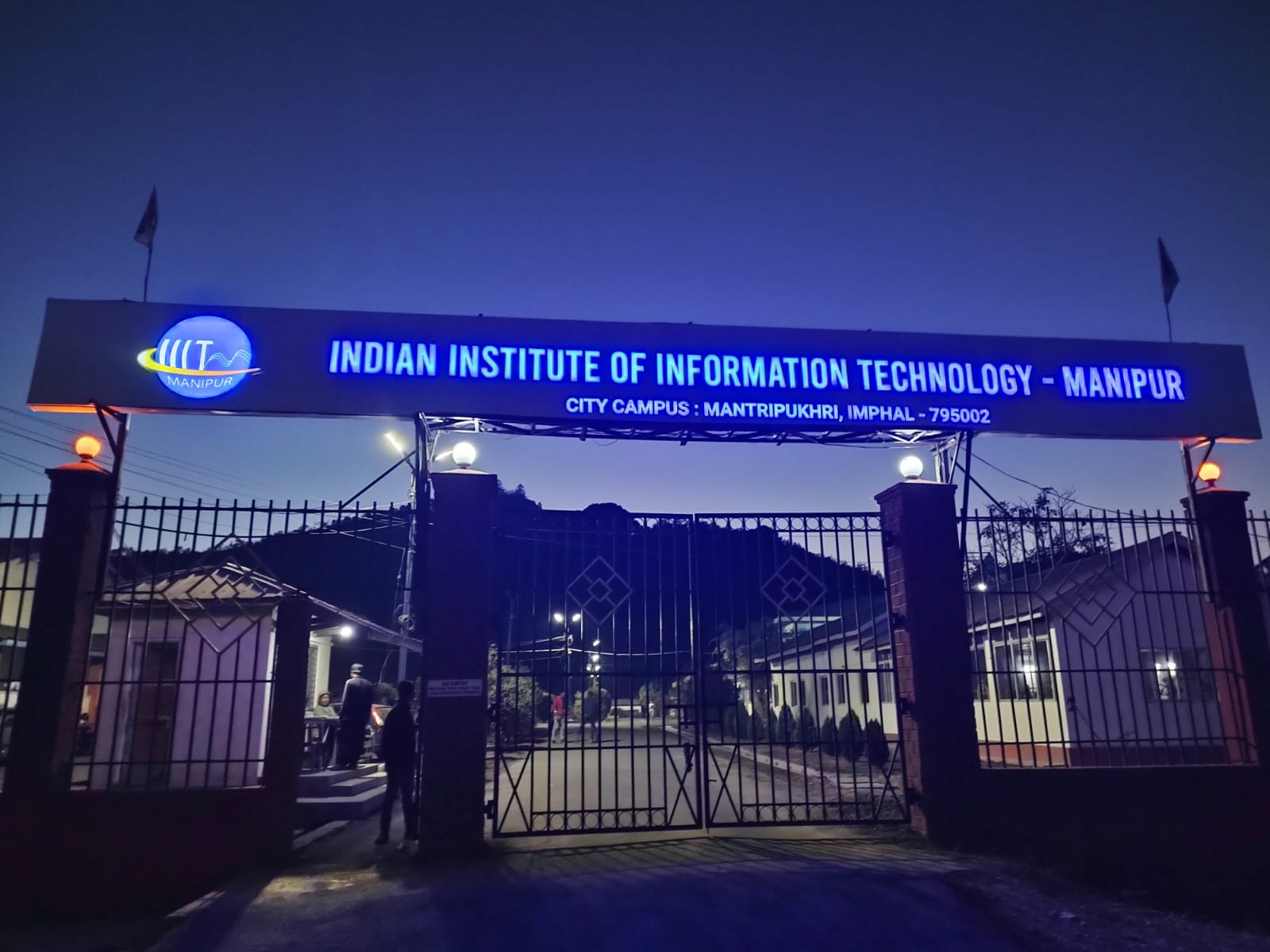
IIIT Senapati (City Campus)

== Campus ==
IIIT Senapati, Manipur is currently operational from its own city campus of 13 Acres located in Mantripukhri, Imphal. The campus is located in very close proximity to Manipur High Court, CRPF Camp, Manipur Information Technology Park, Manipur Software Technology Park, and Secretariat. Considering that the campus is located in an urban area, all the required facilities are available nearby. There are 6 Hostels for boys and 1 for girls with one more hostel under construction and it also has a 200-seater fully operational food court. The college is expected to shift to its permanent campus of 150 acres in the Senapati District of Manipur which is under construction with a budget of around 125 crores by June, 2025.

== Departments ==
- Department of Electronics and Communication Engineering (ECE)
- Department of Humanities and Basic Sciences (HBS)
- Department of Computer Science & Engineering (CSE)

== Labs ==
The campus has fully functional and highly specialized labs such as:

- Data engineering lab
- Software Engineering Lab
- Computer Graphics Lab
- VLSI Lab
- Basic Electronics Lab
- Digital Design Lab

== Sports Facilities ==
The campus has the following sports facilities:

- Volleyball Court
- Badminton Court
- Football Ground
- Cricket Ground
- Table Tennis
- Chess
- Open Gym

== Clubs ==
The college has the following fully active clubs under the aegis of Technical and Cultural Board of IIITM :

- Coding Club
- Google Developer Group(GDG)
- Artificial Intelligence and Machine Learning (AI/ML) Club
- Android Development Club
- Cloud Computing Club
- Cyber Security Club
- Web Development Club
- Literature Club
- Poetry Club (Qurbat)
- Chess Club
- Swimming Club
- Photography Club
- VLSI-Embedded Club
- Performing Arts (Dance & Drama Club)

== Cell/Centre/Division ==
- Alumni Association Cell
- Quality Improvement Cell
- Training & Placement Cell
- Equity Cell
- International Relation Division
- Research Board
- Innovation and Incubation Cell
- NEP 2020 Implementation Committee
- Anti Ragging Committee
- Anti Sexual Harassment Committee
- NEP 2020 Implementation Committee
- Academic Block
- Administrative Block

== Academics ==
=== Admissions ===
Admissions are purely based on merit through the Nationwide Joint Entrance Exam (JEE) Mains which is conducted for the purpose of admission of students into IITs, IIITs, and NITs and the seat allocation will be through Joint Seat Allocation Authority (JoSAA) and Central Seat Allocation Board (CSAB).

The following programs are taught in IIITSM:

==== Bachelors ====
- BTech in Computer Science & Engineering (Course Code: 4110)
- BTech in Computer Science & Engineering with Specialization in Artificial and Data Science [Course Code: 410R]
- BTech in Electronics & Communication Engineering (Course Code: 4114)
- BTech in Electronics & Communication Engineering with Specialization in VLSI & Embedded Systems [Course Code: 410M]

==== PhDs ====
SN	Disciplines	Area of Specialization of PhD	Category
1.	Computer Science and Engineering	Speech Processing, Data Mining, Natural Language Processing, Social Media Analysis, Machine Learning, Human-Computer Interaction, Computer Vision, UAV, Computer Vision, Hyperspectral Image Processing	Full Time/Part-Time
2.	Electronics and Communication Engineering	VLSI & Embedded System, MEMS & Micro-fabrication, RF and Microwaves, Signal Processing & Communication.	Full Time/Part-Time
3.	Mathematics	Computational Mathematics, Sampling Techniques	Full Time/ Part-Time
4.	Linguistics	Lexicography, Language Documentation, Human Language Technology	Full Time/ Part-Time

== Memorandum of understanding (MoU), Collaborations and Partnerships ==
IIIT Manipur has collaborated with various colleges and universities. IIIT Manipur has signed MoUs with various industries and companies.

- With Korean Cultural Centre India on 2 November 2022
- With University of North Texas, USA on 24 April 2022
- With University of Colorado, Springs, USA
- With University of Houston, USA
- With NUS Singapore
- With IIT Kharagpur
- With IIT Guwahati
- With Central Agricultural University, Imphal on 16 September 2022
- With Ugra Research Institute of Information Technology, Russia on 5 June 2017

== See also ==
1. Indian Institutes of Technology
2. National Institutes of Technology (India)
3. Indian Institutes of Information Technology
4. Indian Institute of Science
