= Indian Institute of Information Technology, Ranchi =

Educational institution in Jharkhand, India

- भारतीय सूचना प्रौद्योगिकी संस्थान, रांची
- College Logo
- Other names: IIIT Ranchi, IIITR
- Motto: उद्यमेन हि सिध्यन्ति कार्याणि (Sanskrit)
- Motto in English: Efforts alone bring success in deeds.
- Type: PPP
- Established: 2016; 10 years ago
- Accreditation: Institute of National Importance
- Affiliations: Ministry of Education (India)
- Chairperson: Lt. Gen. A. K. Bhatt (Retd.)
- Director: Rajeev Srivastava
- Academic staff: 80
- Administrative staff: 120
- Undergraduates: 1,130+
- Postgraduates: 120+
- Doctoral students: 25+
- Location: Ranchi, Jharkhand, India; 23.316°N 85.374°E
- Campus: ~5 Acres ARTTC BSNL Campus, 60 Acres Planned; Urban
- Nicknames: IIITians, triple-I-Tians
- Website: www.iiitranchi.ac.in

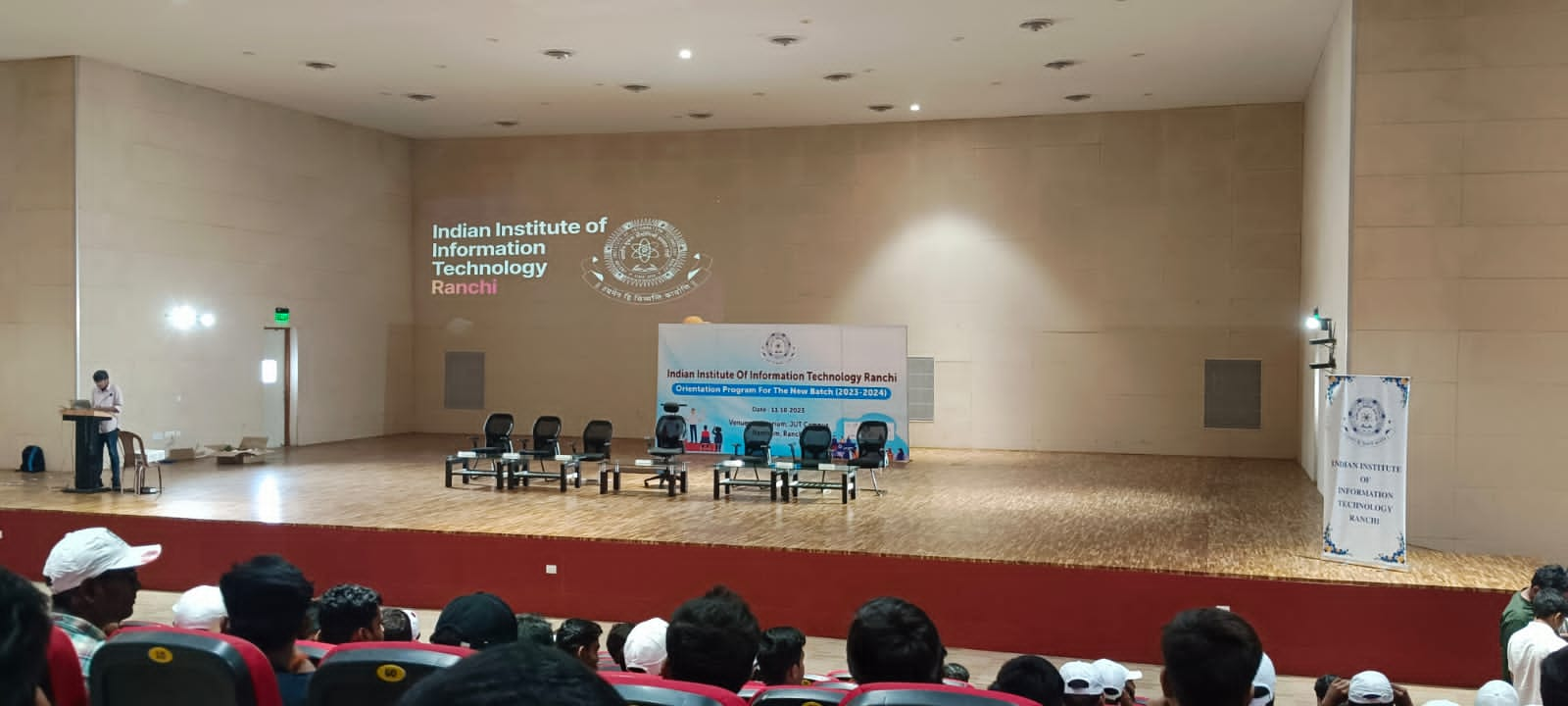
Orientation session 2023

Indian Institute of Information Technology, Ranchi (IIIT Ranchi or IIITR), is one of the Indian Institutes of Information Technology, a group of 25 Interdisciplinary Technical Universities of higher education started by Government of India, focused on Information Technology.

Established in 2016, it mainly offers undergraduate programmes for computer science and electronics. It is an "Institute of National Importance", as declared by an act of parliament.

It is operated on a PPP model and funded by Government of India (50%), Government of Jharkhand (35%) and Industry Partners (15%) namely CIL, TCS and Tata Tech.

== History ==
In December 2015, the central government signed an MoU to establish three IIITs at Ranchi, Nagpur and Pune. In 2016, IIIT Ranchi started under the mentorship of NIT Jamsedpur, with only 60 students in the first batch. In 2017, The Indian Institutes of Information Technology (Public-Private Partnership) Act, 2017 was passed that conferred the INI status on 15 IIITs including IIIT Ranchi.

In May 2023, President Murmu on her three-day Jharkhand visit attended the second convocation of IIIT Ranchi. In November, PM Modi laid the foundation stone for the new campus.

Protests erupted in October 2026 after a first-year student allegedly died by suicide amid concerns over inadequate medical facilities and mismanagement.

== Campus ==
At present, IIIT Ranchi is operating from two interim campuses: BSNL ARTTC campus and Khelgaon(NGHC) campus. Around 60 acres of land has been allotted for the permanent campus in Sanga, Kanke and the campus is under construction.

Prior 2024, it functioned from temporary campuses in JUPMI and JUT Namkum.

== Academics ==
It offers BTech, MTech and PhD programmes in Computer Science and ECE.

Admissions to undergraduate programs are done along with the IITs, NITs & IIITs on the basis of the JEE Main rank. Seats are filled through JOSAA and the CSAB rounds. There is no home state quota or female-only supernumerary seats.

The institute offers the following BTech programs:

- Computer Science and Engineering
- Computer Science and Engineering (with Specialization of Data Science and Artificial Intelligence)
- Electronics and Communications Engineering
- Electronics and Communication Engineering (with Specialization of Embedded Systems and Internet of Things)

== See also ==
- Indian Institutes of Information Technology
- Institutes of National Importance
- BIT Mesra, a GFTI at Ranchi
- List of institutions of higher education in Jharkhand
