= IIITDM =

IIITDM may refer to different Institutes of National Importance in India

- Indian Institute of Information Technology, Design and Manufacturing, Jabalpur
- Indian Institute of Information Technology, Design and Manufacturing, Kancheepuram
- Indian Institute of Information Technology, Design and Manufacturing, Kurnool
