= CSAB =

CSAB may refer to:

- Cadbury Schweppes Americas Beverages
- Central Seat Allocation Board, Indian government agency overseeing admission into Government Funded Technical Institutes
- Colegio San Agustin - Bacolod, an Augustinian school in the Philippines
- CSAB (professional organization), an accreditation supporting organization, formerly called Computing Sciences Accreditation Board, in the United States
- CSαβ (Cysteine-stabilized alpha beta) defensins, a superfamily of proteins, also called cis-defensins
