= Institutes of National Importance =

Premier public higher education institutions in India

In India, an Institution of National Importance (INI) refers to a premier public higher education institution granted special status by the constitution or an act of the Parliament of India. Such institutions are recognized for their pivotal role in developing highly skilled personnel within a specified region of the country or state. Institutes of National Importance enjoy special recognition, greater autonomy, and direct funding from the Government of India.

At the inception of the Constitution of India, the Seventh Schedule declared Banaras Hindu University and Aligarh Muslim University as institutes of national importance. Subsequently 32nd Amendment in 1973 added University of Delhi to the schedule. Other institutions are accorded as INI by legislations or statutory orders.

== Common Acts ==
=== Architecture ===
The Schools of Planning and Architecture (SPA) are declared as Institutes of National Importance through the 'School of Planning and Architecture Act, 2014' and its subsequent amendments.

=== Design ===
- National Institutes of Design (NID) are declared as an Institution of National Importance through the 'National Institute of Design Act 2014' and its subsequent amendments.

=== Engineering and Technology ===
- Indian Institutes of Technology (IIT) are declared as Institutes of National Importance through the Institutes of Technology Act, 1961 and its subsequent amendments.
- National Institutes of Technology (NIT), IIEST Shibpur are declared as Institutes of National Importance through the National Institutes of Technology, Science Education and Research Act, 2007 and its subsequent amendments.
- Indian Institutes of Information Technology (IIIT) are declared as Institutes of National Importance through the 'Indian Institute of Information Technology Act, 2014' and the 'Indian Institutes of Information Technology (Public-Private Partnership) Act, 2017' and their subsequent amendments.
- National Institutes of Food Technology Entrepreneurship and Management (NIFTEM) are declared as Institutes of National Importance through the National Institutes of Food Technology, Entrepreneurship and Management Act, 2021'.

=== Management ===
Indian Institutes of Management (IIM) are declared as Institutes of National Importance through the Indian Institutes of Management Act, 2017 and its subsequent amendments.

=== Medicine ===
All India Institutes of Medical Sciences (AIIMS) are declared as Institutes of National Importance through the 'All India Institute of Medical Sciences Act, 1956' and its subsequent amendments.

=== Pharmacy ===
National Institutes of Pharmaceutical Education and Research (NIPER) are declared as Institutes of National Importance through the 'National Institute of Pharmaceutical Education and Research Act, 1998' and its subsequent amendments.

=== Science ===
Indian Institutes of Science Education and Research (IISER) are Institutes of National Importance through the amendments in the National Institutes of Technology, Science Education and Research Act, 2007.

=== Universities ===
Aligarh Muslim University, Banaras Hindu University, Delhi University declared as Institutes of National Importance through the Entry No. 63 union list-Seventh Schedule to the Constitution of India.

== Summary statistics ==
As of August 2026, there are 173 Institutes of National Importance under various Acts of Parliament. These INIs include: 23 IITs, 20 AIIMSs, 22 IIMs, 31 NITs, 25 IIITs, 7 IISERs, 7 NIPERs, 5 NIDs, 3 SPAs, 2 NIFTEMs, 10 central universities, 4 medical research institutes, and 14 other specialized institutes.

== Indian Institute of Technology (IITs) ==
Location of 23 IITs

Institute	City	State	Founded	Type	Specialization
Indian Institute of Technology, Jodhpur	Jodhpur	Rajasthan	2008	IIT	Engineering
Indian Institute of Technology, Tirupati	Tirupati	Andhra Pradesh	2015	IIT	Engineering
Indian Institute of Technology, Guwahati	Guwahati	Assam	1994	IIT	Engineering
Indian Institute of Technology, Patna	Patna	Bihar	2008	IIT	Engineering
Indian Institute of Technology, Bhilai	Bhilai	Chhattisgarh	2016	IIT	Engineering
Indian Institute of Technology, Delhi	South Delhi	Delhi	1963	IIT	Engineering
Indian Institute of Technology, Goa	Farmagudi	Goa	2016	IIT	Engineering
Indian Institute of Technology, Gandhinagar	Gandhinagar	Gujarat	2008	IIT	Engineering
Indian Institute of Technology, Mandi	Mandi	Himachal Pradesh	2009	IIT	Engineering
Indian Institute of Technology, Jammu	Jammu	Jammu and Kashmir	2016	IIT	Engineering
Indian Institute of Technology (ISM), Dhanbad (Note: IIT Roorkee was included in the IIT system in 2001; IIT-BHU Varanasi was included in the IIT system in 2012; IIT-ISM Dhanbad was included in the IIT system in 2016)	Dhanbad	Jharkhand	1926	IIT	Engineering
Indian Institute of Technology, Dharwad	Dharwad	Karnataka	2016	IIT	Engineering
Indian Institute of Technology, Palakkad	Palakkad	Kerala	2015	IIT	Engineering
Indian Institute of Technology, Indore	Indore	Madhya Pradesh	2009	IIT	Engineering
Indian Institute of Technology, Bombay	Mumbai	Maharashtra	1958	IIT	Engineering
Indian Institute of Technology, Bhubaneswar	Bhubaneswar	Odisha	2008	IIT	Engineering
Indian Institute of Technology, Hyderabad	Hyderabad	Telangana	2008	IIT	Engineering
Indian Institute of Technology, Ropar	Rupnagar	Punjab	2008	IIT	Engineering
Indian Institute of Technology, Madras	Chennai	Tamil Nadu	1959	IIT	Engineering
Indian Institute of Technology, Kanpur	Kanpur	Uttar Pradesh	1959	IIT	Engineering
Indian Institute of Technology (BHU), Varanasi	Varanasi	Uttar Pradesh	1919	IIT	Engineering
Indian Institute of Technology, Roorkee	Roorkee	Uttarakhand	1847	IIT	Engineering
Indian Institute of Technology, Kharagpur	Kharagpur	West Bengal	1951	IIT	Engineering

== Indian Institute of Management (IIMs) ==
Location of 22 IIMs

Institute	City	State	Founded	Type	Specialization
Indian Institute of Management, Ahmedabad	Ahmedabad	Gujarat	1961	IIM	Management
Indian Institute of Management, Amritsar	Amritsar	Punjab	2015	IIM	Management
Indian Institute of Management, Bangalore	Bengaluru	Karnataka	1973	IIM	Management
Indian Institute of Management, Bodh Gaya	Bodh Gaya	Bihar	2015	IIM	Management
Indian Institute of Management, Calcutta	Kolkata	West Bengal	1961	IIM	Management
Indian Institute of Management, Indore	Indore	Madhya Pradesh	1996	IIM	Management
Indian Institute of Management, Jammu	Jammu	Jammu and Kashmir	2016	IIM	Management
Indian Institute of Management, Kashipur	Kashipur	Uttarakhand	2011	IIM	Management
Indian Institute of Management, Kozhikode	Kozhikode	Kerala	1996	IIM	Management
Indian Institute of Management, Lucknow	Lucknow	Uttar Pradesh	1984	IIM	Management
Indian Institute of Management, Nagpur	Nagpur	Maharashtra	2015	IIM	Management
Indian Institute of Management, Raipur	Raipur	Chhattisgarh	2010	IIM	Management
Indian Institute of Management, Ranchi	Ranchi	Jharkhand	2010	IIM	Management
Indian Institute of Management, Rohtak	Rohtak	Haryana	2010	IIM	Management
Indian Institute of Management, Sambalpur	Sambalpur	Odisha	2015	IIM	Management
Indian Institute of Management, Shilliong	Shillong	Meghalaya	2007	IIM	Management
Indian Institute of Management, Sirmaur	Paonta Sahib	Himachal Pradesh	2015	IIM	Management
Indian Institute of Management, Tiruchirappalli	Tiruchirappalli	Tamil Nadu	2011	IIM	Management
Indian Institute of Management, Udaipur	Udaipur	Rajasthan	2011	IIM	Management
Indian Institute of Management, Visakhapatnam	Visakhapatnam	Andhra Pradesh	2015	IIM	Management
Indian Institute of Management, Mumbai (Note: National Institute for Training in Industrial Engineering was re-established as IIM, Mumbai in 2023)	Mumbai	Maharashtra	1963	IIM	Management
Indian Institute of Management, Guwahati	Guwahati	Assam	2026	IIM	Management

== Indian Institute of Information Technology (IIITs) ==
Location of 25 IIITs, 5 MoE-funded (in green) and 20 PPP-mode (in blue)

Institute	City	State	Founded	Type	Specialization
Atal Bihari Vajpayee Indian Institute of Information Technology and Management, Gwalior	Gwalior	Madhya Pradesh	1997	IIIT	Information Technology
Indian Institute of Information Technology, Agartala	Agartala	Tripura	2018	IIIT	Information Technology
Indian Institute of Information Technology, Allahabad	Prayagraj	Uttar Pradesh	1999	IIIT	Information Technology
Indian Institute of Information Technology, Bhagalpur	Bhagalpur	Bihar	2017	IIIT	Information Technology
Indian Institute of Information Technology, Bhopal	Bhopal	Madhya Pradesh	2017	IIIT	Information Technology
Indian Institute of Information Technology, Design and Manufacturing, Jabalpur	Jabalpur	Madhya Pradesh	2005	IIIT	Information Technology
Indian Institute of Information Technology, Design and Manufacturing, Kancheepuram	Chennai	Tamil Nadu	2007	IIIT	Information Technology
Indian Institute of Information Technology, Design and Manufacturing, Kurnool	Kurnool	Andhra Pradesh	2015	IIIT	Information Technology
Indian Institute of Information Technology, Dharwad	Dharwad	Karnataka	2015	IIIT	Information Technology
Indian Institute of Information Technology, Guwahati	Guwahati	Assam	2013	IIIT	Information Technology
Indian Institute of Information Technology, Kalyani	Kalyani	West Bengal	2014	IIIT	Information Technology
Indian Institute of Information Technology, Kota	Kota	Rajasthan	2013	IIIT	Information Technology
Indian Institute of Information Technology, Kottayam	Kottayam	Kerala	2015	IIIT	Information Technology
Indian Institute of Information Technology, Lucknow	Lucknow	Uttar Pradesh	2015	IIIT	Information Technology
Indian Institute of Information Technology, Manipur	Imphal	Manipur	2015	IIIT	Information Technology
Indian Institute of Information Technology, Nagpur	Nagpur	Maharashtra	2016	IIIT	Information Technology
Indian Institute of Information Technology, Pune	Pune	Maharashtra	2016	IIIT	Information Technology
Indian Institute of Information Technology, Raichur	Raichur	Karnataka	2019	IIIT	Information Technology
Indian Institute of Information Technology, Ranchi	Ranchi	Jharkhand	2016	IIIT	Information Technology
Indian Institute of Information Technology, Sonepat	Sonipat	Haryana	2014	IIIT	Information Technology
Indian Institute of Information Technology, Sri City	Sri City	Andhra Pradesh	2013	IIIT	Information Technology
Indian Institute of Information Technology, Surat	Surat	Gujarat	2017	IIIT	Information Technology
Indian Institute of Information Technology, Tiruchirappalli	Tiruchirappalli	Tamil Nadu	2013	IIIT	Information Technology
Indian Institute of Information Technology, Una	Una	Himachal Pradesh	2014	IIIT	Information Technology
Indian Institute of Information Technology, Vadodara	Vadodara	Gujarat	2013	IIIT	Information Technology

== Indian Institute of Science Education and Research (IISERs) ==
Location of 7 IISERs

Institute	City	State	Founded	Type	Specialization
Indian Institute of Science Education and Research, Berhampur	Berhampur	Odisha	2016	IISER	Sciences
Indian Institute of Science Education and Research, Bhopal	Bhopal	Madhya Pradesh	2008	IISER	Sciences
Indian Institute of Science Education and Research, Kolkata	Kalyani	West Bengal	2006	IISER	Sciences
Indian Institute of Science Education and Research, Mohali	Mohali	Punjab	2007	IISER	Sciences
Indian Institute of Science Education and Research, Pune	Pune	Maharashtra	2006	IISER	Sciences
Indian Institute of Science Education and Research, Thiruvananthapuram	Thiruvananthapuram	Kerala	2008	IISER	Sciences
Indian Institute of Science Education and Research, Tirupati	Tirupati	Andhra Pradesh	2015	IISER	Sciences

== All India Institute of Medical Sciences (AIIMSs) ==
Location of 20 AIIMS

Institute	City	State	Founded	Type	Specialization
All India Institute of Medical Sciences, Bathinda	Bathinda	Punjab	2019	AIIMS	Medicine
All India Institute of Medical Sciences, Bhopal	Bhopal	Madhya Pradesh	2012	AIIMS	Medicine
All India Institute of Medical Sciences, Bhubaneswar	Bhubaneswar	Odisha	2012	AIIMS	Medicine
All India Institute of Medical Sciences, Bibinagar	Bibinagar	Telangana	2019	AIIMS	Medicine
All India Institute of Medical Sciences, Bilaspur	Bilaspur	Himachal Pradesh	2020	AIIMS	Medicine
All India Institute of Medical Sciences, Deoghar	Deoghar	Jharkhand	2019	AIIMS	Medicine
All India Institute of Medical Sciences, Gorakhpur	Gorakhpur	Uttar Pradesh	2019	AIIMS	Medicine
All India Institute of Medical Sciences, Guwahati	Guwahati	Assam	2020	AIIMS	Medicine
All India Institute of Medical Sciences, Jodhpur	Jodhpur	Rajasthan	2012	AIIMS	Medicine
All India Institute of Medical Sciences, Kalyani	Kalyani	West Bengal	2018	AIIMS	Medicine
All India Institute of Medical Sciences, Madurai	Madurai	Tamil Nadu	2021	AIIMS	Medicine
All India Institute of Medical Sciences, Mangalagiri	Mangalagiri	Andhra Pradesh	2018	AIIMS	Medicine
All India Institute of Medical Sciences, Nagpur	Nagpur	Maharashtra	2018	AIIMS	Medicine
All India Institute of Medical Sciences, New Delhi	New Delhi	Delhi	1956	AIIMS	Medicine
All India Institute of Medical Sciences, Patna	Patna	Bihar	2012	AIIMS	Medicine
All India Institute of Medical Sciences, Raebareli	Raebareli	Uttar Pradesh	2018	AIIMS	Medicine
All India Institute of Medical Sciences, Raipur	Raipur	Chhattisgarh	2012	AIIMS	Medicine
All India Institute of Medical Sciences, Rajkot	Rajkot	Gujarat	2020	AIIMS	Medicine
All India Institute of Medical Sciences, Rishikesh	Rishikesh	Uttarakhand	2012	AIIMS	Medicine
All India Institute of Medical Sciences, Vijaypur	Jammu	Jammu and Kashmir	2020	AIIMS	Medicine

== National Institute of Technology (NITs) ==
Location of 31 NITs

Institute	City	State	Founded	Type	Specialization
National Institute of Technology, Raipur	Raipur	Chhattisgarh	1956	NIT	Engineering
National Institute of Technology, Rourkela	Rourkela	Odisha	1961	NIT	Engineering
National Institute of Technology, Sikkim	Ravangla	Sikkim	2010	NIT	Engineering
National Institute of Technology, Silchar	Silchar	Assam	1967	NIT	Engineering
National Institute of Technology, Srinagar	Srinagar	Jammu and Kashmir	1960	NIT	Engineering
National Institute of Technology, Tiruchirappalli	Tiruchirappalli	Tamil Nadu	1964	NIT	Engineering
National Institute of Technology, Uttarakhand	Srinagar	Uttarakhand	2010	NIT	Engineering
National Institute of Technology, Warangal	Warangal	Telangana	1959	NIT	Engineering
Dr. B. R. Ambedkar National Institute of Technology, Jalandhar	Jalandhar	Punjab	1987	NIT	Engineering
Malaviya National Institute of Technology, Jaipur	Jaipur	Rajasthan	1963	NIT	Engineering
Maulana Azad National Institute of Technology, Bhopal	Bhopal	Madhya Pradesh	1960	NIT	Engineering
Motilal Nehru National Institute of Technology, Allahabad	Prayagraj	Uttar Pradesh	1961	NIT	Engineering
National Institute of Technology, Agartala	Agartala	Tripura	1965	NIT	Engineering
National Institute of Technology, Andhra Pradesh	Tadepalligudem	Andhra Pradesh	2015	NIT	Engineering
National Institute of Technology, Arunachal Pradesh	Yupia	Arunachal Pradesh	2010	NIT	Engineering
National Institute of Technology, Calicut	Kozhikode	Kerala	1961	NIT	Engineering
National Institute of Technology, Delhi	New Delhi	Delhi	2010	NIT	Engineering
National Institute of Technology, Durgapur	Durgapur	West Bengal	1960	NIT	Engineering
National Institute of Technology, Goa	Cuncolim	Goa	2010	NIT	Engineering
National Institute of Technology, Hamirpur	Hamirpur	Himachal Pradesh	1986	NIT	Engineering
National Institute of Technology, Jamshedpur	Jamshedpur	Jharkhand	1960	NIT	Engineering
National Institute of Technology, Karnataka	Mangaluru	Karnataka	1960	NIT	Engineering
National Institute of Technology, Kurukshetra	Kurukshetra	Haryana	1963	NIT	Engineering
National Institute of Technology, Manipur	Imphal	Manipur	2010	NIT	Engineering
National Institute of Technology, Meghalaya	Shillong	Meghalaya	2010	NIT	Engineering
National Institute of Technology, Mizoram	Aizawl	Mizoram	2010	NIT	Engineering
National Institute of Technology, Nagaland	Chümoukedima	Nagaland	2010	NIT	Engineering
National Institute of Technology, Patna	Patna	Bihar	1886	NIT	Engineering
National Institute of Technology, Puducherry	Karaikal	Puducherry	2010	NIT	Engineering
Visvesvaraya National Institute of Technology, Nagpur	Nagpur	Maharashtra	1960	NIT	Engineering
Sardar Vallabhbhai National Institute of Technology, Surat	Surat	Gujarat	1961	NIT	Engineering

== National Institute of Design (NIDs) ==
Location of 5 NIDs

Institute	City	State	Founded	Type	Specialization
National Institute of Design, Ahmedabad	Ahmedabad	Gujarat	1960	NID	Design
National Institute of Design, Andhra Pradesh	Amaravati	Andhra Pradesh	2015	NID	Design
National Institute of Design, Assam	Jorhat	Assam	2019	NID	Design
National Institute of Design, Haryana	Kurukshetra	Haryana	2016	NID	Design
National Institute of Design, Madhya Pradesh	Bhopal	Madhya Pradesh	2019	NID	Design

== National Institute of Food Technology Entrepreneurship and Management (NIFTEMs) ==
Location of 2 NIFTEMs

Institute	City	State	Founded	Type	Specialization
National Institute of Food Technology Entrepreneurship and Management, Sonepat	Sonepat	Haryana	2012	NIFTEM	Food Technology
National Institute of Food Technology, Entrepreneurship and Management, Thanjavur	Thanjavur	Tamil Nadu	1967	NIFTEM	Food Technology

== National Institute of Pharmaceutical Education and Research (NIPERs) ==
Location of 7 NIPERs

Institute	City	State	Founded	Type	Specialization
National Institute of Pharmaceutical Education and Research, Ahmedabad	Ahmedabad	Gujarat	2007	NIPER	Pharmaceutical Science
National Institute of Pharmaceutical Education and Research, Guwahati	Guwahati	Assam	2008	NIPER	Pharmaceutical Science
National Institute of Pharmaceutical Education and Research, Hajipur	Hajipur	Bihar	2007	NIPER	Pharmaceutical Science
National Institute of Pharmaceutical Education and Research, Hyderabad	Hyderabad	Telangana	2007	NIPER	Pharmaceutical Science
National Institute of Pharmaceutical Education and Research, Kolkata	Kolkata	West Bengal	2007	NIPER	Pharmaceutical Science
National Institute of Pharmaceutical Education and Research, Mohali	Mohali	Punjab	1998	NIPER	Pharmaceutical Science
National Institute of Pharmaceutical Education and Research, Raebareli	Raebareli	Uttar Pradesh	2007	NIPER	Pharmaceutical Science

== School of Planning and Architecture (SPAs) ==
Location of 3 SPAs

Institute	City	State	Founded	Type	Specialization
School of Planning and Architecture	Bhopal	Madhya Pradesh	2008	SPA	Architecture
School of Planning and Architecture	New Delhi	Delhi	1941	SPA	Architecture
School of Planning and Architecture	Vijayawada	Andhra Pradesh	2008	SPA	Architecture

== Central Universities ==
Institute	City	State	Founded	Type	Specialization
Rashtriya Raksha University (Note: Raksha Shakti University was re-established as Rashtriya Raksha University in 2020)	Gandhinagar	Gujarat	2009	University	Security Studies
Aligarh Muslim University	Aligarh	Uttar Pradesh	1920	University	General
Banaras Hindu University	Varanasi	Uttar Pradesh	1916	University	General
Nalanda University	Rajgir	Bihar	2010	University	Social Science
Dr. Rajendra Prasad Central Agriculture University	Samastipur	Bihar	1905	University	Agricultural Science
National Forensic Sciences University (Note: Gujarat Forensic Science University was re-established as National Forensic Sciences University in 2020)	Gandhinagar	Gujarat	2020	University	Forensic Science
Visva-Bharati University	Santiniketan	West Bengal	1921	University	General
Rani Lakshmi Bai Central Agricultural University	Jhansi	Uttar Pradesh	2014	University	Agricultural Science
University of Allahabad	Prayagraj	Uttar Pradesh	1887	University	General
University of Delhi	New Delhi	Delhi	1922	University	General

== Medical Research Institutes ==
Institute	City	State	Founded	Specialization
National Institute of Mental Health and Neurosciences	Bengaluru	Karnataka	1847	Medicine
Postgraduate Institute of Medical Education and Research	Chandigarh	Chandigarh	1962	Medicine
Sree Chitra Tirunal Institute for Medical Sciences and Technology	Thiruvananthapuram	Kerala	1973	Medicine
Jawaharlal Institute of Postgraduate Medical Education and Research (Note: Ecole de Médicine de Pondichéry was re-established as JIPMER in 1964)	Pondicherry	Puducherry	1823	Medicine

== Other Specialized Institution ==
Institute	City	State	Founded	Specialization
The Asiatic Society	Kolkata	West Bengal	1784	Oriental Studies
Indian Institute of Engineering Science and Technology, Shibpur (Note: Bengal Engineering and Science University was re-established as IIEST, Shibpur in 2014)	Howrah	West Bengal	1856	Engineering
Dakshina Bharat Hindi Prachar Sabha	Chennai	Tamil Nadu	1918	Language Studies
Kalakshetra Foundation	Chennai	Tamil Nadu	1936	Arts and Culture
Indian Statistical Institute	Kolkata	West Bengal	1931	Statistics
Academy of Scientific and Innovative Research	Ghaziabad	Uttar Pradesh	2010	Sciences
Footwear Design and Development Institute	Noida	Uttar Pradesh	1986	Applied Design
India International Arbitration Centre	New Delhi	Delhi	2020	International Law
Rajiv Gandhi National Institute of Youth Development	Chennai	Tamil Nadu	1993	Youth Affairs
Regional Centre for Biotechnology	Faridabad	Haryana	2009	Biotechnology
Rajiv Gandhi Institute of Petroleum Technology	Amethi	Uttar Pradesh	2007	Petroleum Engineering
Tribhuvan Sahkari University (Note: Institute of Rural Management, Anand was re-established as Tribhuvan Sahkari University in 2025)	Anand	Gujarat	1979	Cooperation
Indian Institute of Petroleum and Energy	Visakhapatnam	Andhra Pradesh	2016	Petroleum Engineering
Institute of Teaching and Research in Ayurveda, Jamnagar (Note: Gujarat Ayurved University was re-established as Institute of Teaching and Research in Ayurveda, Jamnagar in 2020)	Jamnagar	Gujarat	2020	Ayurvedic Medicine

== See also ==
- Ivy League, a formal grouping of leading private universities in the Northeastern United States
- Russell Group, a formal grouping of universities in the United Kingdom
- Golden Triangle (English universities), a group of universities in Oxford, Cambridge, London
- SKY (universities), a group of universities in South Korea
- C9 League – The Chinese Ministry of Education's formal grouping of elite universities in China
- TU9, alliance of nine leading Technical Universities in Germany
- Group of Eight (Australian universities), formal group of eight universities in Australia
- Ancient universities, the Universities formed before the year 1600 with undergraduate MA awarding powers in United Kingdom and Ireland
- Imperial Universities, a grouping of older universities in Japan
- Double First-Class Construction, funding scheme for universities in China
- Institutions of Eminence
- BRICS Universities League, a consortium of leading research universities from BRICS countries
