= Indian Institute of Information Technology, Pune =

University In Pune, Maharashtra

Indian Institute of Information Technology (IIIT), Pune
- भारतीय माहिती तंत्रज्ञान संस्था, पुणे
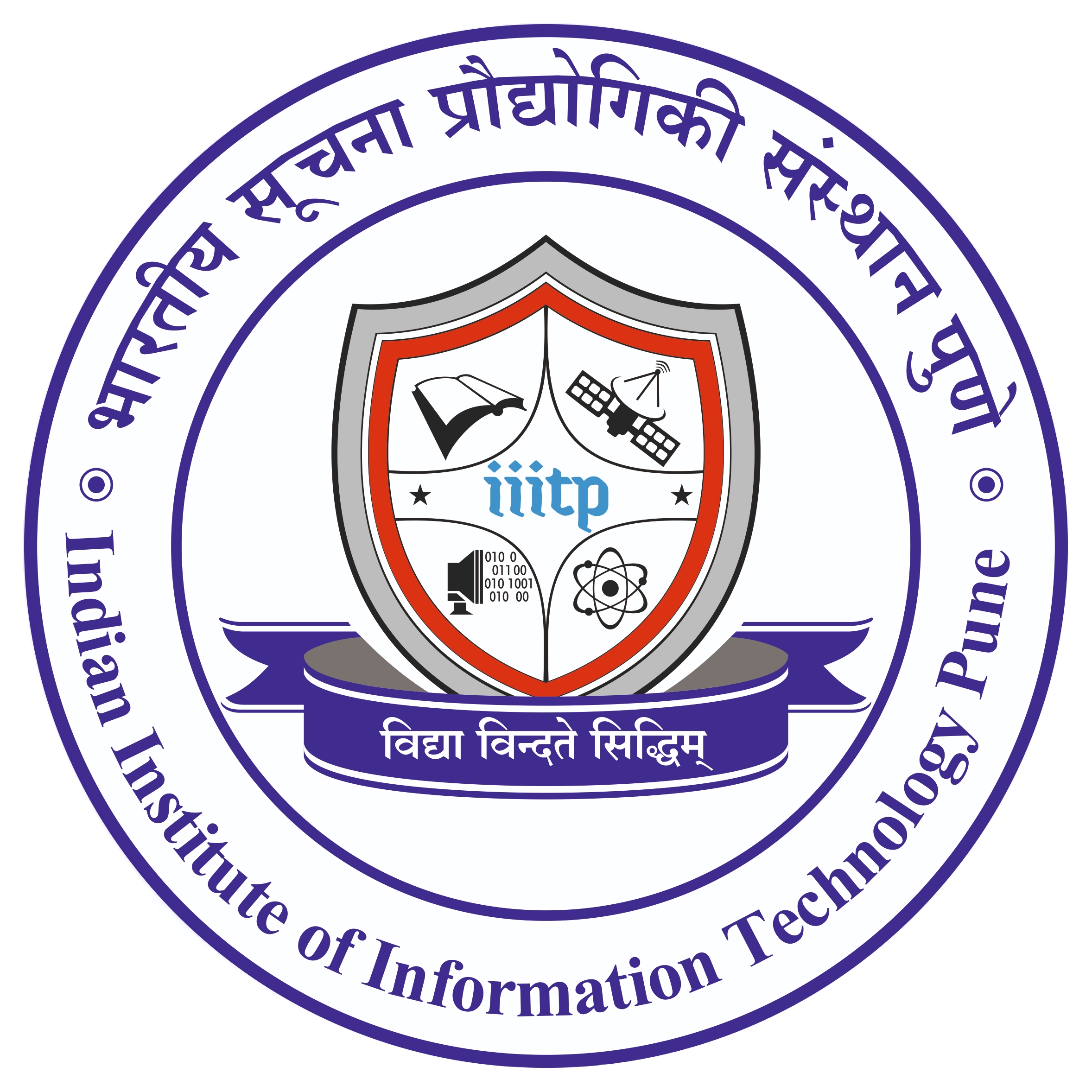
- IIITP Logo
- Former name: IIIT Pune
- Motto: Leading Technology Leveraging Technology
- Type: Public-Private Partnership Institute of National Importance
- Established: July 2016
- Founders: Ministry of Education, Government of Maharashtra, and industry partners
- Parent institution: Ministry of Education, Government of India
- Accreditation: Unaccredited (Institute of National Importance)
- Affiliations: Institute of National Importance
- Academic affiliations: Institute of National Importance
- Chairperson: Shri Vishad Mafatlal
- Visitor: The President of India, Droupadi Murmu
- Director: Prof. Vineet Kansal
- Academic staff: 40+
- Administrative staff: 36+
- Total staff: 70+
- Students: 1500+
- Undergraduates: 1200+
- Postgraduates: 70+
- Doctoral students: 90+
- Location: Indian Institute of Information Technology (IIIT) Pune Gat No - 5 & 6, Vill - Nanoli-Tarf Chakan, PO - Talegaon, Tah - Maval, Dist-Pune, Maharashtra-410507, Pune, Maharashtra, Maharashtra, 410507, India; 18°45′50″N 73°41′51″E
- Campus: 100 acres (40 ha); Urban
- Language: English
- Colors: Blue & red
- Website: www.iiitp.ac.in
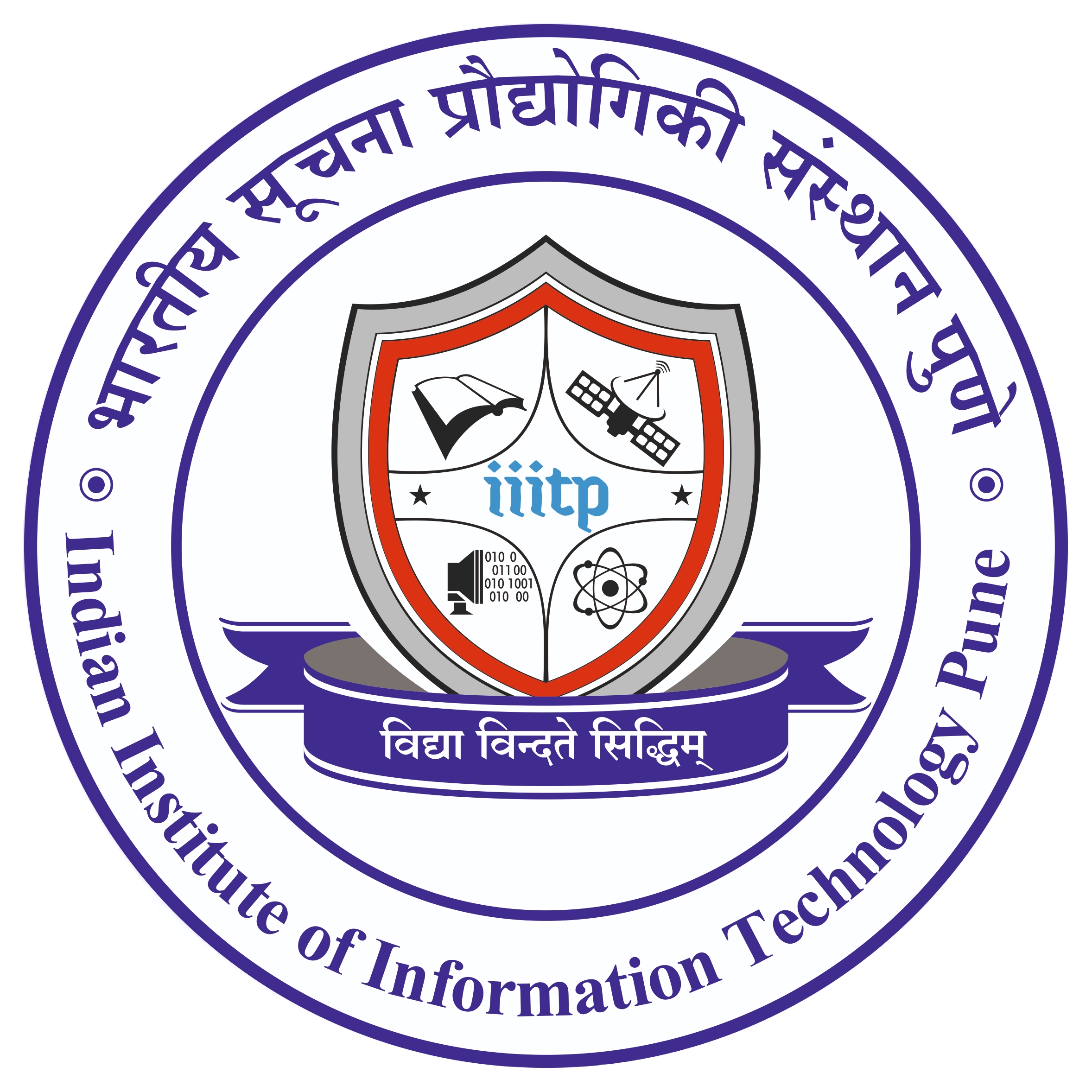

Indian Institute of Information Technology (IIIT), Pune (abbreviated IIITP), is one of the Indian Institutes of Information Technology, a group of institutes of Higher education in India focused on Information Technology. It is established by the Ministry of Education (MoE), formerly the Ministry of Human Resource Development, Government of India and few industry partners as Not-for-profit Public Private Partnership (N-PPP) Institution. IIIT Pune was declared as an Institute of National Importance (INI) in August 2017.

== History and legislative foundation ==
The Indian Institute of Information Technology, Pune (IIITP) was established in 2016 by the Ministry of Education (MoE), Government of India, in partnership with the Government of Maharashtra and industry partners.

The institute was granted the status of an Institute of National Importance (INI) under the Indian Institutes of Information Technology (Public-Private Partnership) Act, 2017. This statutory framework grants the institute complete academic and administrative autonomy to innovate in advanced technological fields.

IIITP is located in Pune, Maharashtra, and it started its academic sessions from July 2016. It offers two courses in Bachelor of Technology (B.Tech.), Computer Science and Engineering (CSE) and Electronics and Communication Engineering (ECE). From A.Y. 2019–20, the institute has started Master of Technology (M.Tech.) and Doctor of Philosophy (Ph.D.) programmes. The institute offers M.Tech. programmes through its department of CSE with specialization in Artificial Intelligence (AI) and department of ECE with specialization in Internet of Things (IoT).

M.Tech. programmes are two years structured programmes with credit components from one year of course work and one year of project/ thesis. The academic programme leading to the Ph.D. degree involves a course credit requirement and a research thesis submission. The Institute encourages research in interdisciplinary areas through a system of joint supervision and interdepartmental group activities.

To address the challenges faced by the Indian IT industry and growth of the domestic IT market, the Ministry of Education, Government of India intended to establish twenty Indian Institutes of Information Technology (IIIT), on a Not-for-profit Public Private Partnership (N-PPP) basis. The partners in setting up the IIITs are Ministry of Education, Governments of the respective States where each IIIT will be established, and the industry.

IIITP was approved by the Government of India's Ministry of Education. IIITP has been set up on a public–private partnership (PPP) basis. Fifty percent of the stakes are held by Ministry of Education, whereas thirty five percent is held by the Government of Maharashtra; the rest is held by industry partners.

== Governance and administration ==
Under the IIIT (PPP) Act, 2017, the President of India is the ex-officio Visitor. The Board of Governors is chaired by Shri Vishad Mafatlal, and the Senate handles academic matters. Director Prof. Vineet Kansal leads daily operations with the Registrar and Deans.

== Academics ==
IIIT Pune offers undergraduate, postgraduate, and doctoral degrees across engineering and applied sciences. For the 2026–27 academic year, the Bachelor of Technology (B.Tech.) programme has a total intake capacity of 674 students across five disciplines admitted through the Joint Seat Allocation Authority (JoSAA) and CSAB based on JEE Main ranks. The institute also offers an optional B.Tech. (Honours) track with a minor or major specialization. Postgraduate admissions to Master of Technology (M.Tech.) programmes are conducted through Centralized Counselling for M.Tech. (CCMT) based on GATE scores.

Bachelor of Technology (B.Tech.)	Master of Technology (M.Tech.)	Doctor of Philosophy (Ph.D.)
Computer Science and Engineering; Electronics and Communication Engineering; Artificial Intelligence and Data Science; Cybersecurity; Microelectronics and VLSI Design	Computer Science and Engineering (Specialization: Artificial Intelligence); Electronics and Communication Engineering (Specialization: Internet of Things)	Computer Science and Engineering; Electronics and Communication Engineering; Applied Mathematics and Data Science; Humanities, Social Science and Management

=== Research and collaborations ===
The institute features nine faculty-led research groups and a Start-up and Innovation Cell. In July 2026, IIIT Pune signed an MoU with IIT Bombay for joint research, cybersecurity internships, and academic exchanges. In November 2026, it partnered with AIIMS Nagpur to advance research in medical data analytics, healthcare informatics, and AI-based diagnostics. International admissions are available through DASA.

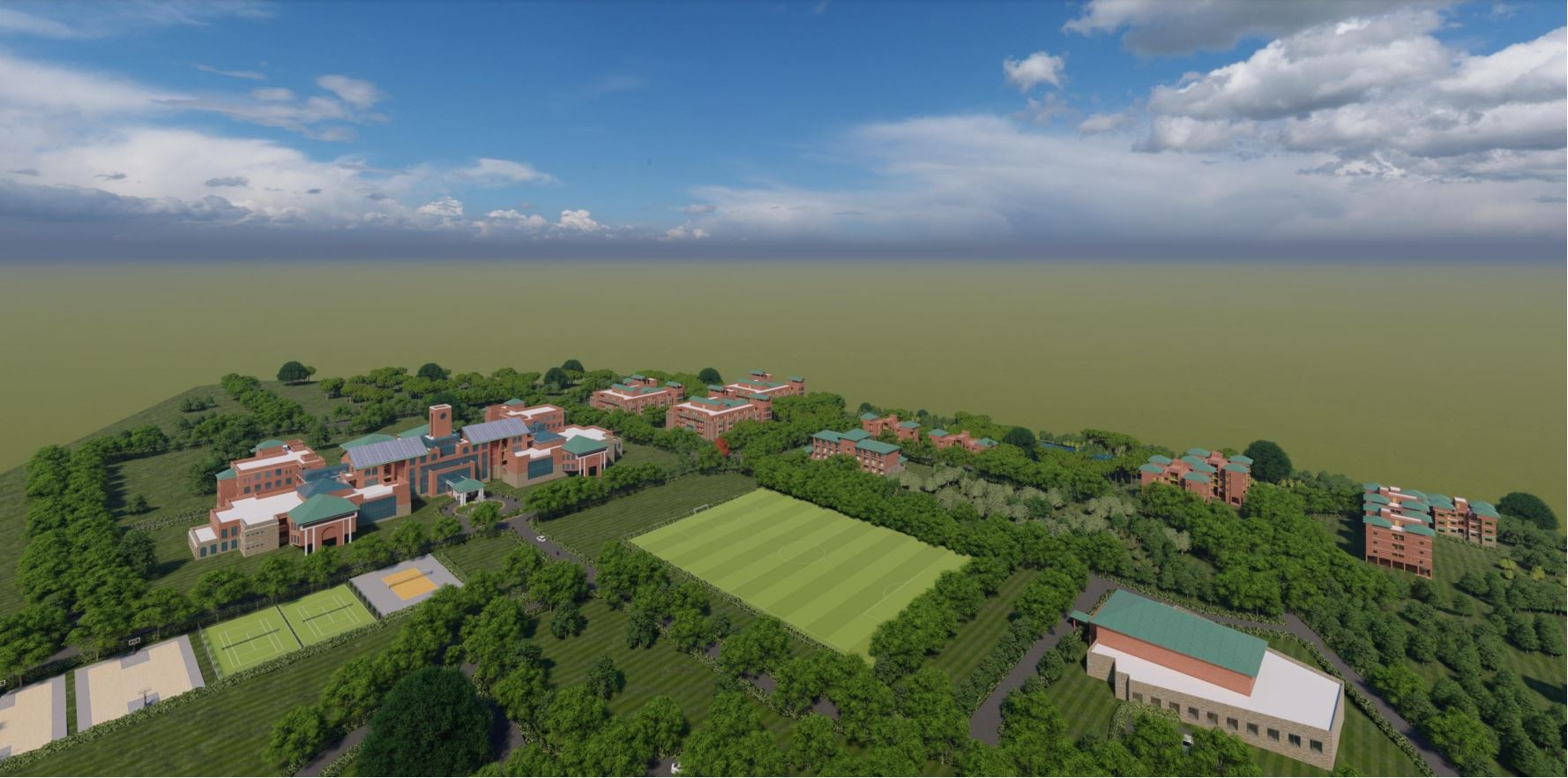
IIIT Pune Permanent Campus Plan

=== Convocation ===
IIIT Pune held its inaugural convocation ceremony on 23 March 2024, presided over by Anil Sahasrabudhe as chief guest, during which 339 graduates were awarded degrees. Degrees are conferred upon graduating B.Tech., M.Tech., and Ph.D. candidates following approval by the Senate and Board of Governors, with academic records integrated into the National Academic Depository (NAD).

== International relations ==
Established in June 2026, the International Relations Office (IRO) coordinates global academic partnerships, student and faculty exchange programmes, and joint research initiatives. In July 2026, the office hosted delegations from the Indo-Korean Center (South Korea) and Aivancity School (France) to explore credit-transfer student exchanges and collaborative research in artificial intelligence, cybersecurity, VLSI, and IoT.

== Placement ==
Managed by the Career Development & Corporate Relation Centre (CDCRC), the 2025–26 placement season recorded a 71% placement rate with over 145 offers from 75+ recruiters. The highest CTC reached ₹45 LPA, with average and median packages of ₹17.85 LPA and ₹14.45 LPA respectively, featuring recruiters such as Amazon, Cisco, Qualcomm, and Nvidia.

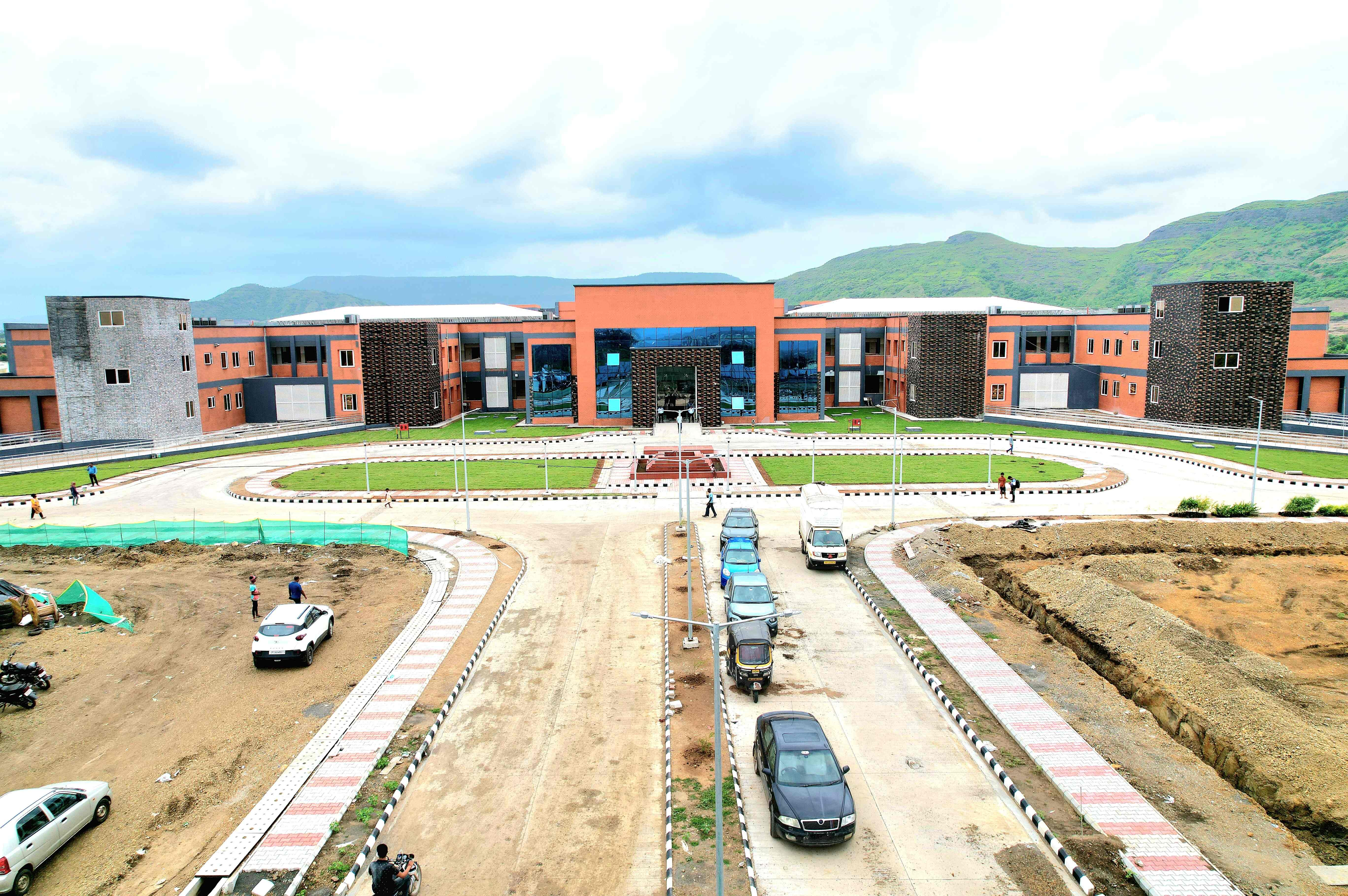
Current Status of IIIT Pune Campus

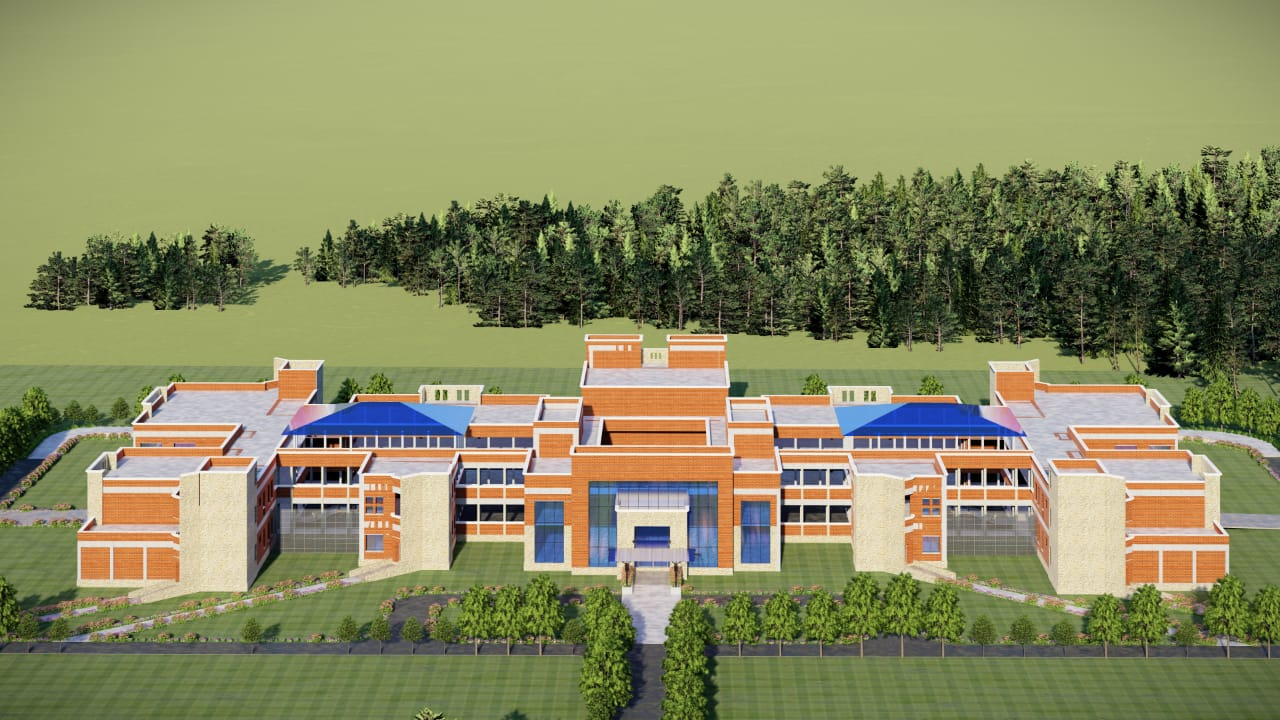
A Design layout of Academic Building

== Campus ==
IIIT Pune operates from its 100-acre (40 ha) permanent residential campus located at Nanoli Tarf Chakan near Talegaon in Maval taluka, Pune district, approximately 5 kilometres (3.1 mi) from Talegaon railway station and 35 kilometres (22 mi) from Pune city. Prior to relocating to its permanent campus, the institute functioned out of transit campuses in Pune following its establishment in 2016.

Developed by the Central Public Works Department (CPWD), the barrier-free campus comprises a 12,108 square metres (130,330 sq ft) academic complex with 18 classrooms, 12 laboratories, a library, a conference hall, and a 300-seat auditorium. Residential and student facilities include two boys' hostels (capacity of 345 students each), a girls' hostel (capacity of 179 students), faculty and staff housing, dining halls, a sports and fitness centre, and an on-campus medical facility.

Library and Information Center Housed within the academic complex, the Library and Information Center occupies 163 square metres (1,750 sq ft) with a seating capacity of over 85 users. Its collection comprises over 4,500 print books alongside more than 50,000 electronic journals, indexed through an online public access catalogue (OPAC) powered by Koha.

Through the One Nation One Subscription (ONOS) initiative and INFLIBNET Centre's INFED remote-access portal, the library provides access to scholarly databases, Shodhganga thesis repositories, Indian Research Information Network System (IRINS) faculty research profiles, and plagiarism detection tools including Turnitin and Shodh Shuddhi.

== Student life ==
The Student Activity Council (SAC) manages technical, cultural, and sports clubs and a National Service Scheme (NSS) unit. Highlights include an ACM SIGCHI chapter, national hackathons, HR summits, and the Eclectic Times newsletter. Notable student projects include Zariya, a voice-guided payment app for visually impaired users, and the machine-learning tennis training platform NextPlayAI.

== Alumni ==
The IIIT Pune Alumni Association connects graduates with current students and faculty through mentorship programmes, career guidance, and regional alumni chapters. Following its inaugural chapter meet in Pune in June 2026, the institute hosted its second regional alumni interaction in Bengaluru in September 2026.

== See also ==
- Indian Institutes of Information Technology
- Institutes of National Importance
- Education in Pune
- Ministry of Education
