= Government Funded Technical Institutes =

Public technical institutes in India

- Participating institutes (2025–26): 47
- Admission authority: Joint Seat Allocation Authority
- Country: India

The Government Funded Technical Institutes (GFTIs) are 47 academic institutions funded by the Government of India or state governments of India that participate in the Joint Seat Allocation Authority (JoSAA) for undergraduate admissions in engineering, technology, architecture, planning, and sciences.

Admissions are conducted by JoSAA on the basis of merit in the Joint Entrance Examination – Main.

== Institutes ==
Government Funded Technical Institutes (2025–26)
| Sl. No. | Name | Place | State/UT |
|---|---|---|---|
| 1 | Assam University | Silchar | Assam |
| 2 | Birla Institute of Technology, Mesra | Ranchi | Jharkhand |
| 3 | Birla Institute of Technology, Deoghar Off-Campus | Deoghar | Jharkhand |
| 4 | Birla Institute of Technology, Patna Off-Campus | Patna | Bihar |
| 5 | Central Institute of Technology, Kokrajhar | Kokrajhar | Assam |
| 6 | Central University of Haryana | Mahendragarh | Haryana |
| 7 | Central University of Jammu | Jammu | Jammu & Kashmir |
| 8 | Central University of Jharkhand | Ranchi | Jharkhand |
| 9 | Central University of Rajasthan | Ajmer | Rajasthan |
| 10 | Chhattisgarh Swami Vivekanand Technical University | Bhilai | Chhattisgarh |
| 11 | Gati Shakti Vishwavidyalaya | Vadodara | Gujarat |
| 12 | Ghani Khan Choudhury Institute of Engineering & Technology | Malda | West Bengal |
| 13 | Gurukul Kangri University | Haridwar | Uttarakhand |
| 14 | Indian Institute of Carpet Technology | Bhadohi | Uttar Pradesh |
| 15 | Indian Institute of Handloom Technology, Salem | Salem | Tamil Nadu |
| 16 | Indian Institute of Handloom Technology, Varanasi | Varanasi | Uttar Pradesh |
| 17 | Institute of Chemical Technology, Mumbai: Indian Oil Odisha Campus | Bhubaneswar | Odisha |
| 18 | Institute of Engineering and Technology, Dr. Hari Singh Gour University (A Central University) | Sagar | Madhya Pradesh |
| 19 | Institute of Infrastructure Technology Research and Management | Ahmedabad | Gujarat |
| 20 | Institute of Technology, Guru Ghasidas Vishwavidyalaya | Bilaspur | Chhattisgarh |
| 21 | International Institute of Information Technology, Bhubaneswar | Bhubaneswar | Odisha |
| 22 | Dr. Shyama Prasad Mukherjee International Institute of Information Technology | Naya Raipur | Chhattisgarh |
| 23 | Islamic University of Science and Technology | Pulwama | Jammu & Kashmir |
| 24 | J. K. Institute of Applied Physics and Technology, University of Allahabad | Allahabad | Uttar Pradesh |
| 25 | Jawaharlal Nehru University | New Delhi | Delhi |
| 26 | Mizoram University | Aizawl | Mizoram |
| 27 | National Institute of Advanced Manufacturing Technology | Ranchi | Jharkhand |
| 28 | National Institute of Electronics & Information Technology | Chhatrapati Sambhaji Nagar | Maharashtra |
| 29 | National Institute of Electronics and Information Technology, Ajmer | Ajmer | Rajasthan |
| 30 | National Institute of Electronics and Information Technology, Gorakhpur | Gorakhpur | Uttar Pradesh |
| 31 | National Institute of Electronics and Information Technology, Patna | Patna | Bihar |
| 32 | National Institute of Electronics and Information Technology, Ropar | Ropar | Punjab |
| 33 | National Institute of Food Technology Entrepreneurship and Management | Sonepat | Haryana |
| 34 | National Institute of Food Technology, Entrepreneurship and Management, Thanjavur | Thanjavur | Tamil Nadu |
| 35 | North Eastern Regional Institute of Science and Technology | Itanagar | Arunachal Pradesh |
| 36 | North-Eastern Hill University | Shillong | Meghalaya |
| 37 | Puducherry Technological University | Puducherry | Puducherry |
| 38 | Punjab Engineering College | Chandigarh | Chandigarh |
| 39 | Rajiv Gandhi National Aviation University | Fursatganj, Amethi | Uttar Pradesh |
| 40 | Sant Longowal Institute of Engineering and Technology | Longowal | Punjab |
| 41 | School of Engineering, Tezpur University | Tezpur | Assam |
| 42 | School of Planning and Architecture, Bhopal | Bhopal | Madhya Pradesh |
| 43 | School of Planning and Architecture, New Delhi | New Delhi | Delhi |
| 44 | School of Planning and Architecture, Vijayawada | Vijayawada | Andhra Pradesh |
| 45 | Shri G. S. Institute of Technology and Science | Indore | Madhya Pradesh |
| 46 | Shri Mata Vaishno Devi University | Katra | Jammu & Kashmir |
| 47 | University of Hyderabad | Hyderabad | Telangana |

== See also ==
- Centrally Funded Technical Institutes
- Institutes of National Importance
- Indian Institutes of Technology
- National Institutes of Technology
- Indian Institutes of Information Technology
- Central Seat Allocation Board
- Joint Seat Allocation Authority
- Joint Entrance Examination – Main
- Higher education in India
