= Indian Institute of Information Technology, Vadodara =

Higher-education institute in Gujarat, India

Indian Institute of Information Technology Vadodara
- Motto: Progress and Service
- Type: Public–private partnership
- Established: 2013; 13 years ago
- Director: Dharmendra Singh
- Undergraduates: 851 (including 2021 batch)
- Postgraduates: 29
- Doctoral students: 14
- Location: Gandhinagar, Gujarat, India; 22.5926372°N 88.3642916°E
- Website: www. iiitvadodara.ac.in

Indian Institute of Information Technology Vadodara (IIITV) is a higher-education institute located in Gandhinagar, Gujarat, India. It is one of the Indian Institutes of Information Technology established by the Ministry of Education, Government of India under the Indian Institutes of Information Technology (Public-Private Partnership) Act, 2017. The act provides the institute the status of Institute of National Importance.

== History ==
In the year 2010, the Government of India, MHRD had announced the scheme to set-up twenty IIITs under the Public-Private Partnership (PPP) model. The scheme envisages the establishment of autonomous, not for profit, self-sustaining, research-led educational institutes which will contribute significantly to the global competitiveness in the key sectors of the Indian economy and industry. These institutes are expected to focus on applied research and education in applied IT in selected domain areas.

IIITV was set up in 2013 under this scheme in partnership between the Government of India (50% Contribution), the Government of Gujarat (the State Government) (35% Partnership), Tata Consultancy Services (5% Partnership), Gujarat State Fertilizers and Chemicals Limited (5% Partnership) and Gujarat Energy Research and Management Institute (5% Partnership). The institute was initially registered as a society and charitable trust with the Registrar of societies at Vadodara under Societies Registration Act, 1860|Societies Registration Act 1860 and Bombay Public trust Act, 1950. The first graduating batch consists of 36 B.Tech. students is graduated in 2017. The first batch of M.Tech. students were admitted in 2017 graduating in 2019.

IIITV has opened its first satellite campus named Indian Institute of Information Technology Vadodara - International Campus Diu (IIITV-ICD) in 2020. IIITV-ICD has been established at Education Hub, Kevdi – Diu under partnership with Government of Dadra & Nagar Haveli & Daman & Diu (UT Administration of DNHDD). The graduates will be awarded degree by IIIT Vadodara. IIITV-ICD has admitted his first batch of 75 BTech students in Academic Year 2020-21.

== Campus ==
The institute is currently operating from the Government Engineering College Campus, Sector 28, Gandhinagar, Gujarat, India. Government of Gujarat has allotted 50 acres of land in Knowledge City near Dumad, Vadodara, Gujarat.

== Academics ==
=== Academic programmes ===
IIITV offers Bachelor of Technology (B.Tech.), Master of Technology (M.Tech.) VS Doctor of Philosophy (Ph.D.) degrees the fields of information technology and science.

=== Admission ===
BTech: Admission to the B.Tech. program is made through Joint Seat Allocation Authority JoSAA/CSAB through the Joint Entrance Examination (Main) (JEE Main) examination conducted by National Testing Agency under MoE, Government of India. The minimum qualification for B.Tech. is 10+2 (or equivalent). Admissions for foreign nationals/PIOs/NRIs are conducted through DASA scheme. Foreign students are also admitted through the Study in India Scheme (SII).

MTech: Admissions to the M.Tech. program is made through the Centralized Counselling for M.Tech./M.Arch./M.Plan./M.Des. admissions (CCMT). The minimum qualification is B.Tech. in an approved discipline.

PhD: Admissions to the Ph.D. program is made through institute-level test. The Ph.D. admissions are conducted up to twice a year in June and December.
