= Indian Institute of Information Technology, Una =

Engineering college in Himachal Pradesh, India

- Other name: IIIT Una
- Motto: विद्या सर्वज्ञ गौरव:
- Motto in English: Knowledge is the glory of all
- Type: Public-Private Partnership
- Established: 2014 (12 years ago)
- Affiliations: Institute of National Importance
- Chairperson: Ravi Sharma
- Director: Dr. Manish Gaur
- Undergraduates: ~700 (2022–23)
- Location: Una, Himachal Pradesh, India; 31.481124°N 76.190682°E
- Campus: Permanent, 80-acre (0.32 km^{2})
- Colors: Golden Brown
- Nickname: IIITians
- Website: www.iiitu.ac.in

Indian Institute of Information Technology Una (IIIT, Una) is one of the Indian Institutes of Information Technology located at Vill. Saloh, Teh. Haroli, Distt. Una Himachal Pradesh-177209, Himachal Pradesh. Established in 2014, it was recognized as an Institute of National Importance. IIIT Una is a joint venture of the Ministry of Human Resource Development, Government of India, the Govt. of Himachal Pradesh, with Industries in Public-Private Partnership model. The industries are H.P. Power Corporation and H.P. Power Transmission Corporation.

== History ==
On 18 March 2013, Ministry of Human Resource Development, Government of India introduced a bill in the Parliament to establish 20 new Indian Institute of Information Technology's in different parts of the country. As per the bill, MHRD established 20 new IIITs under the Public-Private Partnership (PPP) mode partnering with respective state governments and industry partners.

IIITU started to intake students from the academic year 2014–15, offering Computer Science and Engineering and Electronics and Communication Engineering to the incoming students, functioning in the campus of NIT Hamirpur, with NIT Hamirpur acting as their mentor institute. At the start of the academic year 2017–18, Information Technology branch was also started in the institute.

On 9 August 2017, The Indian Institutes of Information Technology (Public-Private Partnership) Act, 2017 was passed, following which IIITU along with other newly established IIITs, was conferred the status of an Institute of National Importance. The bill, was passed, aiming to generate highly competent manpower of global standards for the Information Technology Industry, expected to act as a major catalyst to develop new knowledge in the field of Information Technology. On 3 October 2017, Prime Minister of India Narendra Modi laid the foundation stone of IIITU.

On 5 July 2018, Prof. Subramaniam Selvakumar was appointed by the MHRD as the full-time director of the institute, thus making IIITU not requiring any further mentoring from NIT Hamirpur. In March 2019, IIITU and IIT Ropar signed an MoU at Hamirpur, with an aim of developing the fraternity between IIITU and IIT Ropar. The MoU would allow IIITU to have access to various labs and advance research facilities and allow the institutes in joint research collaborative projects. Prof. Vinod Yadava, Director NIT Hamirpur also inaugurated the websites of the 10 student associations which included FORCE (CSE), Aavesh (ECE), Amogh (Magazine), etc. On 29 March 2019, IIITU held its first-ever convocation for the students of batch 2014–18, on the same day IIITU signed an MoU with IIT Mandi, through which Prof. Timothy A. Gonsalves, Director IIT Mandi, agreed in assisting IIITU in developing courses based practicum components of the IIT Mandi curriculum.

Before the academic year 2019–20, NIT Hamirpur expressed its inability in accommodating IIIT Una students in its campus, thus for want of hostel accommodation for the new incoming students, a need of a second campus was expressed by the administration. By the start of the academic year 2019–20, IIITU started its second temporary campus (TC-II) in Chandpur, Haroli, Una, where all the new incoming students were accommodated. At the same time the students of II, III and IV year had their classes conducted in the temporary campus in NIT Hamirpur (TC-I).

Now, IIIT Una is functioning from the permanent campus in the close proximity of Una city.

On August 25, 2023, Shree Ravi Sharma was appointed as the Chairperson of the Board of Governors of the Indian Institute of Information Technology (IIIT) Una by the President of India, Ravi Sharma has played a key role as CEO at Nokia and Adani, and has also been a part of the IIT Alumni Council. He is a distinguished alumnus of IIT Roorkee.

On December 7, 2023 Prof. Binod Kumar Kanaujia was appointed as new Director of IIIT Una by the Department of Higher Education, Ministry of Education, Prof. Binod Kumar Kanaujia has previously served NIT Jalandhar as Director. He joined office on 22 December 2023.

On April 23, 2024 Dr. Manish Gaur was appointed as new Director of IIIT Una by the Department of Higher Education, Ministry of Education. He joined office on 24 April 2024.He has previously served IET Lucknow as a senior professor of CSE Department.

== Admissions ==
The admission to IIIT is through JOSAA and Central Seat allocation Board (CSAB). The students are allotted admission by JOSSA based on their Joint Entrance Examination (JEE-Mains) ranks. The Indian Institute of Information Technology, Una is listed in the CSAB website under List of participating institutes. For Master of Technology (M. Tech) and Doctor of Philosophy (PhD) degrees you can apply at institute website.

== Academic programs ==
The Institute presently offers B.Tech in Computer Science and Engineering (CSE) and Electronics and Communication Engineering (ECE). IIIT Una offers postgraduate programs in the form of Master of Technology (M. Tech) and Doctor of Philosophy (PhD) degrees.

== Campus ==
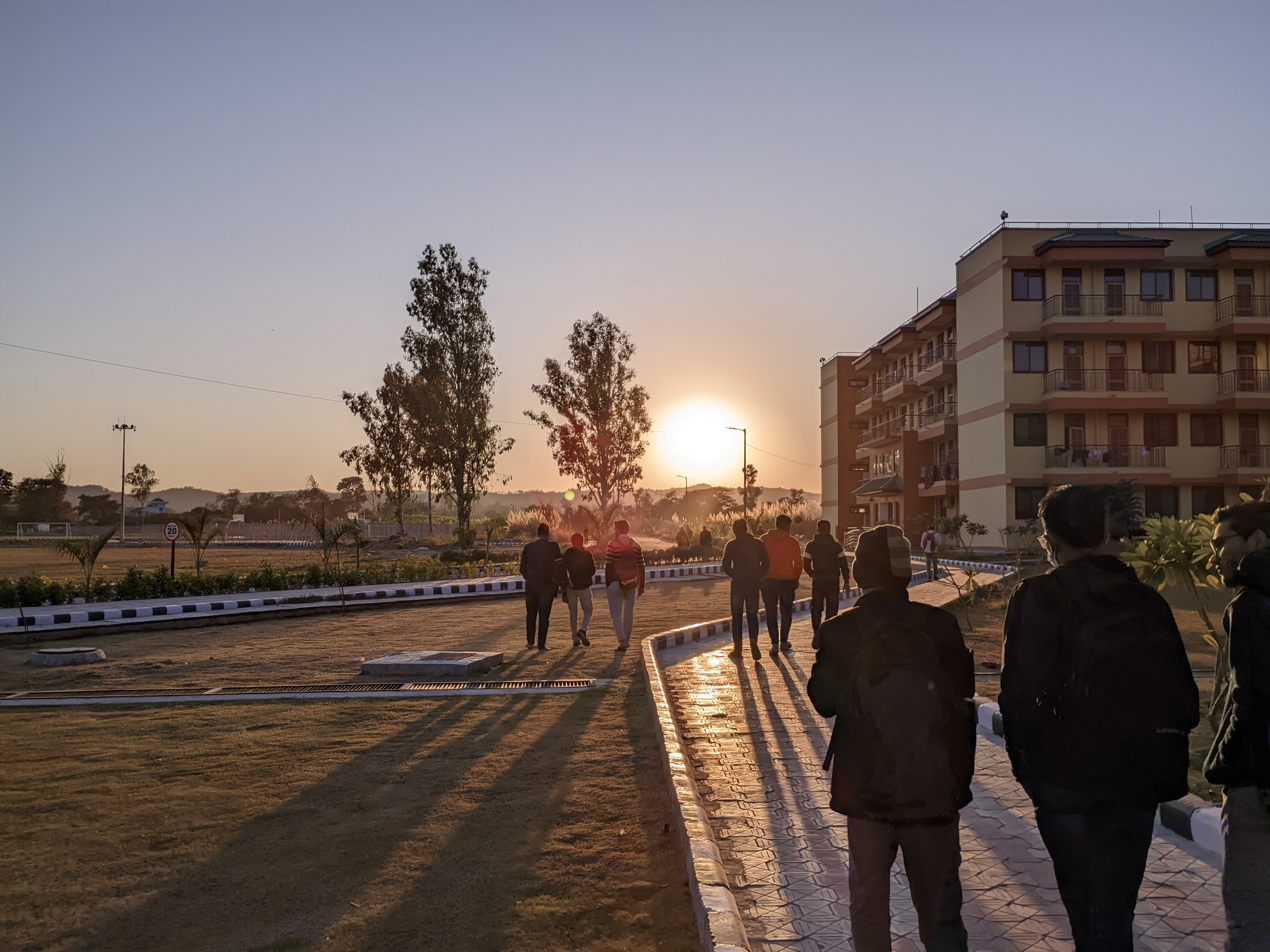
Permanent Campus

IIIT Una is located 80 Km from Jalandhar, Punjab and 120 Km from Chandigarh Airport, and about 20 Km from Una Railway station. The faculty to student ratio is 1:15. There are currently 3 Hostel located inside the main campus accommodating 600+ students.

IIIT Una permanent campus is situated at Vill. Saloh, Teh. Haroli, Distt. Una Himachal Pradesh-177209.

== Organisation and administration ==
IIIT Una shares common visitor(a position held by the president of India) as rest of IIT, IIIT, NIT. The Board of Governance (BoG) of the Indian Institute of Information Technology (IIIT) Una comprises a distinguished group of individuals representing various sectors and expertise. The committee is responsible for overseeing the strategic direction, policies, and overall functioning of the institute. As of the latest information available, the members of the BoG IIIT Una are Chairperson, Secretary Dept. of HE MoE, one Central Govt nominee (Shri. Rakesh Ranjan) and an Additional Secretary (Technical Education) Deptt. of HE MoE, one State Govt nominee and experts from other IIT NIT and IIIT.

The academic policies of IIIT Una are decided by its senate. It consists of all professors of the institute and from other technical Institutes, and administrative and student representatives. The senate controls and approves the curriculum, courses, examinations and results, and appoints committees to look into specific academic matters. The teaching, training and research activities of the institute are periodically reviewed by the senate to maintain educational standards. The Director of IIIT Una is the ex officio chairman of the Institute Senate.
