= International Arbitration and Mediation Centre =

International Arbitration Centre
- Established: 2019
- Jurisdiction: International
- Location: Hyderabad
- Website: https://iamch.org.in/

Secretary-General

Chairperson

International Arbitration and Mediation Centre (IAMC) as proposed by the International Arbitration and Mediation Centre Trust is an autonomous body which was inaugurated in Hyderabad by Chief Justice of India NV Ramana and Telangana Chief Minister K. Chandrasekhar Rao. It is fourth centre of its kind after ones in Dubai, London and Singapore. The institution acts as mediator or arbitrator for contract value of more than 30 million Indian rupees (393,000 USD) in case of dispute involving any entity owned or managed by Government of Telangana.

== Objective ==
International Arbitration and Mediation Centre was started in Hyderabad as an arbitration and mediation centre as proposed by the International Arbitration and Mediation Centre Trust for resolving commercial disputes and between Government of Telangana and common public.

== Pre-Requisite for Mediation ==
Any ministry, public sector company, department, or any entity controlled or managed by the government of Telangana with a contract value of more than 30 million INR (US$393,000) can request for arbitration/mediation with the institution

== Location ==
The facility is being constructed behind IKEA and in proximity to the IT hub. Government of Telangana provided land and ₹50 crore (US$5.3 million) for construction of building.

== Trustees ==
The trustees of the Institution's board will include Telangana Law ministers, senior judges and other eminent people who will ensure policy level execution apart from regularly amending the policies.

== Members ==
International Arbitration and Mediation Centre operations is managed by a professional Secretary with the support from qualified staff. Many famous persons from legal profession, experts and veterans in commerce industry with specialised in arbitration and mediation field both from India and abroad will form the Governing council of the institution.

== See also ==
- Dispute resolution
- Singapore International Mediation Centre
- New Delhi International Arbitration Centre
- Hong Kong International Arbitration Centre
- London Court of International Arbitration
