= Indian Institute of Information Technology, Sonepat =

Technical institute in Haryana, India

- Motto: Tejaswi Naav Dweetmastu
- Type: An Institute of National Importance, under PPP Model
- Established: 2014; 12 years ago
- Affiliations: UGC
- Chairperson: Kavita Khanna
- Director: Dr. Manisha Sharma
- Undergraduates: 180
- Location: Sonipat, Haryana, India
- Website: www.iiitsonepat.ac.in

Indian Institute of Information Technology Sonepat (IIIT Sonepat) is an Indian Institutes of Information Technology located at Sonipat, Haryana. The academic session of IIIT Sonepat started from its temporary campus at NIT Kurukshetra from year 2014 Right now it is running in Shri Balwant Institute of Technology, GT Road Sonepat. IIIT Sonepat is a joint venture of the Ministry of Human Resource Development, Government of India, the Govt. of Haryana, with Industries in Public-Private Partnership model and has been declared as the Institutes of National Importance.

== History ==
On 18 March 2013, Ministry of Human Resource Development, Government of India introduced a bill in the Parliament to establish 20 new Indian Institute of Information Technology's in different parts of the country. As per the bill, MHRD established 20 new IIITs under the Public-Private Partnership (PPP) mode partnering with respective state governments and industry partners.

IIIT-S started to intake students from the academic year 2014–15, offering Computer Science and Engineering, Electronics and Communication Engineering and Information technology to the incoming students, functioning in the campus of NIT Kurukshetra, with NIT Kurukshetra acting as their mentor institute.

On 9 August 2017, The Indian Institutes of Information Technology (Public-Private Partnership) Act, 2017 was passed, following which IIIT-S along with other newly established IIITs, was conferred the status of an Institute of National Importance. The bill, was passed, aiming to generate highly competent manpower of global standards for the Information Technology Industry, expected to act as a major catalyst to develop new knowledge in the field of Information Technology.

== Admissions ==
The admission to IIIT is through Joint Seat Allocation Authority (JOSAA) and Central Seat allocation Board (CSAB). The students are allotted admission by JOSAA based on their Joint Entrance Examination (JEE-Main) ranks.

== Academic programs ==
The Institute presently offers B.Tech in Computer Science and Engineering (CSE) and Information Technology (IT) and Data Science Analytics (DSA) with an intake of 120, 60 and 60 students respectively.

== Campus ==
IIIT Sonepat campus is under constructions. The initial classes were running in the premises and under the mentorship of National Institute of Technology, Kurukshetra till 2018, after which the classes were shifted to Rajiv Gandhi Education City in the secondary campus of Indian Institute of Technology Delhi.

In a major development in the field of education, the Indian Institute of Information Technology, Sonepat (IIIT Sonepat) has announced its campus shift to the SBIT (Sonepat-Bahalgarh Industrial Area) in the year 2022. Currently, the 1st, 2nd, and 3rd-year students are studying at the new transit campus, while the 4th-year students are still studying at the IIT Delhi Technopark Campus.

== Hostels ==
The administration has taken action by allocating hostels to the 1st year students on the SBIT campus. They claim this will enable them to have easy access to the facilities and amenities available on the campus, and create a sense of community among the students.

For the 2nd and 3rd-year students, the administration has arranged for accommodation at the Stanford International School, which is managed by CoHo. The school is located 1.6 km from the SBIT campus, and buses have been arranged to transport the students to and from the campus. The accommodation provided by CoHo is known for its modern facilities and comfortable living spaces, ensuring that the students have a comfortable stay during their studies.

The girls are currently residing at the IIT Delhi Technopark campus along with the 4th-year students. The IIIT Sonepat administration has made arrangements to ensure the safety and security of the girls while they are residing on the Technopark campus.
