= Indian Institutes of Information Technology =

Group of 25 institutes of national importance in India

- Other name: IIIT or IIITs (plural)
- Type: Institutes of National Importance
- Established: 8 December 2014 (via IIIT Act, 2014; first institute 1997)
- Parent institution: Ministry of Education, Government of India
- Budget: ₹650 crore (US$69 million) (FY 2026-27 est.)
- Location: 25 cities across India
- Website: www.iiitcouncil.in

The Indian Institutes of Information Technology (IIITs) are a group of 25 technical research institutions in India focused on information technology. They are officially designated as Institutes of National Importance (INI) by various Acts of Parliament.

As of 2026, the IIIT system is divided into two governance models:

- MoE Funded: Five institutes are fully established, funded, and managed by the Ministry of Education.
- PPP Model: Twenty institutes are set up under a public–private partnership (PPP) model. The financial contribution for these institutes is shared between the central government, the respective state governments, and industry partners in a ratio of 50:35:15.

== The "Indian" vs. "International" Distinction ==
There are two distinct groups of institutes using the "IIIT" acronym in India:

1. Indian Institutes of Information Technology (The Government Group): These are the 25 institutes established by the Ministry of Education (listed below).
2. International/State/Private Institutes: Renowned institutions such as IIIT Hyderabad, IIIT Bangalore, IIIT Bhubaneswar and IIIT Naya Raipur are independent and are not a part of this central government group. IIIT Delhi is also not a part of this group.
3. LNM Institute of Information Technology, Jaipur also belongs to the family of International Institute of Information Technology based on the same N-PPP( Not For Profit Public Private Partnership) with Ministry of Human Resource Development of the state govt with industry partner same as IIIT Hyderabad and IIIT Bangalore.

== List of IIITs ==
IIITs and locations (Official List)
#	Name	Short name	Established	Mode	State/UT
1	ABV-IIITM Gwalior	ABV-IIITMG	1997	MoE	Madhya Pradesh
2	IIIT Allahabad	IIITA	1999	MoE	Uttar Pradesh
3	IIITDM Jabalpur	IIITDMJ	2005	MoE	Madhya Pradesh
4	IIITDM Kancheepuram	IIITDMK	2007	MoE	Tamil Nadu
5	IIITDM Kurnool	IIITDMK	2015	MoE	Andhra Pradesh
6	IIIT Sri City	IIITS	2013	PPP	Andhra Pradesh
7	IIIT Guwahati	IIITG	2013	PPP	Assam
8	IIIT Vadodara	IIITV	2013	PPP	Gujarat
9	IIIT Kota	IIITK	2013	PPP	Rajasthan
10	IIIT Tiruchirappalli	IIITT	2013	PPP	Tamil Nadu
11	IIIT Dharwad	IIITDWD	2015	PPP	Karnataka
12	IIIT Una	IIITU	2015	PPP	Himachal Pradesh
13	IIIT Sonipat	IIITSNP	2014	PPP	Haryana
14	IIIT Kalyani	IIITK	2015	PPP	West Bengal
15	IIIT Lucknow	IIITL	2015	PPP	Uttar Pradesh
16	IIIT Kottayam	IIITK	2015	PPP	Kerala
17	IIIT Manipur	IIITM	2015	PPP	Manipur
18	IIIT Nagpur	IIITN	2016	PPP	Maharashtra
19	IIIT Pune	IIITP	2016	PPP	Maharashtra
20	IIIT Ranchi	IIITR	2016	PPP	Jharkhand
21	IIIT Surat	IIITS	2017	PPP	Gujarat
22	IIIT Bhopal	IIITB	2017	PPP	Madhya Pradesh
23	IIIT Bhagalpur	IIITBH	2017	PPP	Bihar
24	IIIT Agartala	IIITA	2018	PPP	Tripura
25	IIIT Raichur	IIITR	2019	PPP	Karnataka
