= Indian Institute of Information Technology, Bhopal =

Institute in Bhopal, Madhya Pradesh

- Motto: विद्ययाऽमृतमश्नुते (Sanskrit)
- Type: Autonomous University
- Established: 2017; 9 years ago
- Chairperson: Mr. Ashok Kumar Modi
- Director: Ashutosh Kumar Singh
- Location: Bhopal, Madhya Pradesh, 462003, India; 23.217°N 77.408°E
- Campus: Urban
- Website: iiitbhopal.ac.in

The Indian Institute of Information Technology Bhopal (IIIT-B) is one among the 20 IIITs established under the non-profit Public-Private Partnership (PPP) model by Ministry of Human Resource Development. It is presently functioning inside the campus of Maulana Azad National Institute of Technology while 50 acres of land were identified for setting up a permanent campus. It was declared as an Institute of National Importance as per The Indian Institute of Information Technology (Public-Private Partnership) Act 2017.

It offers B.Tech, MCA, M.Tech, and Doctoral (Ph.D.) programs in Information Technology, Computer Science and Engineering, Electronics & Communication engineering, Physics, Mathematics, and allied interdisciplinary areas, with a focus on research-driven and industry-relevant education.

== Campus ==
The institute is currently operating from the campus of Maulana Azad National Institute of Technology (MANIT), Bhopal. For its permanent establishment, approximately 60 acres of land have been allocated at Fatehpur Dobra in Bhopal district, Madhya Pradesh. The proposed campus is planned over 24.68 hectares and will comprise dedicated Administrative and Academic Blocks, Teaching and Laboratory Blocks, a Knowledge, Information and Auditorium Complex, as well as Startup and Incubation and Research and Innovation Centers.
