= Indian Institute of Information Technology, Agartala =

Coordinates: 23°58′N 91°25′E

- College Logo
- Other name: IIIT Agartala
- Type: Public-Private Partnership
- Established: 2018; 8 years ago
- Accreditation: Institute of National Importance
- Affiliations: Ministry of Education (India)
- Chairperson: Lt. Gen. Himalaya Singh (Retd.)
- Director: Dr. Abhay Kumar
- Academic staff: 2
- Administrative staff: 10
- Students: Approx 300
- Postgraduates: 0
- Location: Agartala, Tripura, India
- Campus: Urban
- Website: iiitagartala.ac.in

Indian Institute of Information Technology, Agartala is one among the 20 IIITs established under the non-profit Public-Private Partnership (PPP) model. It is presently functioning inside the campus of NIT Agartala until the construction of a 52-acre permanent campus in Bodhjung Nagar near Agartala is completed.

== History ==
The project to establish IIIT Agartala was approved in 2012. In 2020, the institute was granted Institute of National Importance tag. The computer science and engineering department is currently the only branch if IIIT Agartala. It is mentored by the CSE department of NIT Agartala where the faculties are in charge of conducting the course. Faculty members of the Computer Science and Engineering Branch of IIIT Agartala are

- Prof. Mrinal Kanti Deb Barma, Professor and HOD (Ph.D (Assam University),M. Tech (NIT Allahabad), B. Tech (IET, Lucknow University))
- Dr. Sushmita Sharma, Assistant Professor (B.Tech (TIT Narsingarh), M.Tech (HIT WestBengal), Ph.D (NIT Agartala))
- Dr. Sayeda Zeenat Marshoodulla, Assistant Professor (Ph.D (NEHU Shillong))
