= Indian Institute of Information Technology, Guwahati =

Institute in Assam, India

IIIT Guwahati
- Type: Public-Private Partnership
- Established: 2013 (13 years ago)
- Academic affiliations: Institute of National Importance
- Chairman: Subramaniam Ramadorai
- Director: Sarat Kumar Patra
- Location: Guwahati, Assam, India; 26.0813094°N 91.5619965°E
- Campus: Urban, 67-acre (0.27 km^{2})
- Colours: Blue
- Website: www.iiitg.ac.in

Indian Institute of Information Technology, Guwahati (IIIT G) is one of the Indian Institutes of Information Technology (IIIT) located in Guwahati in the state of Assam in India. It was set up by the MHRD, Government of India in public-private partnership (PPP) mode. It was declared as an Institute of National Importance under the Indian Institutes of Information Technology (Public-Private Partnership) Act, 2017.

== History ==
On 18 March 2013, the Ministry of Human Resource Development, the Government of India introduced a bill in the Parliament to establish 20 new Indian Institute of Information Technology's in different parts of the Country. As per the bill, MHRD will establish the 20 new IIITs under the Public-Private Partnership (PPP) mode partnering with respective state governments and industry partners. The industry partners are Tata Consultancy Services, Oil India, Srei Infrastructure Finance, Assam Electronics Development Corp (Amtron), Novatium and Medhassu eSolutions.

=== Foundation ===
IIIT Guwahati was set up in 2013. The foundation stone for the present campus of IIIT Guwahati at Santola village of Bongora was unveiled in the presence of Hon'ble Prime Minister, Shri Narendra Modi. IIITG started operations in August 2013 in temporary premises within the Assam Textile Institute campus at Ambari, Guwahati.

== Academics ==
IIITG offers B.Tech. degree in computer science and engineering and electronics and communication engineering. Admission to all undergraduate programmes are on the basis of the All India Rank (AIR) in the Joint Entrance Examination (Main) (JEE- Main). From 2015 onwards students enrolled in the research Doctoral Programme (awarding a Ph.D.) after either completing a B.Tech. degree or an M.Tech. one. IIIT Guwahati has also started an MTech Programme for CSE and ECE graduates from 2018.

IIIT Guwahati houses the following departments:

- Department of Computer Science and Engineering
- Department of Electronics & Communication Engineering
- Department of Mathematics
- Department of Humanities and Social Sciences (English, Linguistics, Economics and Political Science)

=== Rankings ===
University and college rankings

Engineering – India
- NIRF (2022): 112

IIIT, Guwahati was ranked 112 among all engineering colleges in India by the National Institutional Ranking Framework (NIRF) in 2022.

== Campus ==
The Institute shifted to its permanent campus on July 2, 2018. The campus is located on a 67-acre plot, 4 km from Lokpriya Gopinath Bordoloi International Airport, on the National Highway. A 9200 sqm Academic-cum-Administration building houses all the Institute's activities.

== Annual festivals ==
Yuvaan is the annual technical, sports cum cultural extravaganza of IIITG.
