= Indian Institute of Information Technology, Surat =

University in India

Coordinates: 21.164583°N 72.785239°E

Indian Institute of Information Technology Surat
- Motto: Knowledge and Hard Work are always revered
- Type: Institute of National Importance
- Established: 2017; 9 years ago
- Director: Rajeev Shorey
- Location: Surat, Gujarat, India
- Website: www.iiitsurat.ac.in

The Indian Institute of Information Technology Surat (IIIT Surat) is one of the Indian Institutes of Information Technology established by MHRD in PPP mode located in Surat, Gujarat.The Institute has been conferred as Institute of National Importance (INI) on Feb 5, 2020. IIIT Surat is operating from its temporary premises at Sardar Vallabhbhai National Institute of Technology (SVNIT). The institute is mentored by SVNIT for an initial period of 2–3 years till the construction of the new campus. The IIIT Surat is built on a public-private partnership (PPP) model, jointly funded by the state government and industry partners Gujarat Narmada Valley Fertilisers & Chemicals, Gujarat Gas and Gujarat Informatics.

== History ==
To address the challenges faced by the Indian IT Industry & growth of the domestic IT Market, the Ministry of Human Resource Development (MHRD), Government of India has established twenty Indian Institutes of Information Technology (IIIT), on a not-for-profit Public Private Partnership basis. As a part of this, IIIT-Surat was planned and started with initial mentoring by SVNIT, Surat till the new campus of IIIT is ready in Surat. A memorandum of understanding and a memorandum of association have been signed between the President of India, the Governor of the State of Gujarat and Industry partners namely; Gujarat Narmada Fertilizer Corporation (GNFC), Gujarat Informatics Limited (GIL) and Gujarat Gas Limited (GAL). After a series of meetings at MHRD, Directorate of Technical Education (Gujarat State) and SVNIT, Surat planned various academic activities. The State Government has requested Collector of Surat to allocate 50 acres of land in Surat, which is in progress. B.Tech. courses in Electronics & Communication Engineering and Computer Science & Engineering began in SVNIT campus from July, 2017.

== Campus ==
The new academic facility was developed on the land allotted by the Gujarat government at Kamrej in the Surat district. The additional facilities will be developed on campus shortly. The facility contains the necessary infrastructure for the institute.

== Academics ==
=== Academic programmes ===
The institute currently offers only B.Tech courses in Computer Science Engineering and Electronics and Communication Engineering. The academic activities of IIIT-Surat are in time-synchronization with those of SVNIT.

The curriculum of both branches is designed to keep in mind the latest standards of the industry. The latest topics in the field of information technology, like machine learning, natural language processing, artificial intelligence, etc., are also prescribed in the syllabuses of both branches. Advanced courses and a total of seven electives in later years enable students to specialize in signal processing, robotics, embedded systems, and other streams. The syllabus is also updated periodically in order to cater to the needs of the industry. The core subjects of the branches are introduced in the first year itself.

=== Admissions ===
The admission to the above-mentioned courses is through the JEE MAINS Entrance Exam. The counseling & Seat Allotment is conducted by Joint Seat Allocation Authority (JoSAA).
