= India International Arbitration Centre =

India International Arbitration Centre (IIAC)
- Established: 2020
- Location: Vasant Kunj, Delhi
- Website: indiaiac.org

Chairperson
- Currently: Justice Hemant Gupta (Retd.)

The India International Arbitration Centre is an autonomous institution based in Delhi, to conduct arbitration, mediation, and conciliation proceedings. It was established in 2019 and declared as an Institute of National Importance by an Act of Parliament.
