= Indian Institute of Information Technology Kalyani =

Institute of National Importance in Kalyani, West Bengal

Indian Institute of Information Technology, Kalyani
- Motto: vidyādhanaṁ sarvadhanapradhānam
- Motto in English: Knowledge is Supreme of all Wealth
- Type: Public-private technical university
- Established: 21 May 2014; 12 years ago
- Budget: ₹9.82 crore (US$1.0 million) (FY2024–25 est.)
- Chairperson: Satyabrata Dey
- Director: Santanu Chattopadhyay
- Faculty: 26 (2025)
- Students: 654 (2025)
- Undergraduates: 592 (2025)
- Doctoral students: 62 (2025)
- Location: Kalyani, West Bengal, India; 22°57′39.82″N 88°26′0.4″E
- Campus: Midsize city 50 acres (20 ha)
- Colours: Blue & Sky
- Website: iiitkalyani.ac.in

Indian Institute of Information Technology, Kalyani (IIIT Kalyani) is an Indian Institute of Information Technology located in Kalyani, West Bengal, and is one of the 31 IIITs established by the Government of India. The institute was set up by the Ministry of Education, Government of West Bengal, and industry partners (Coal India and Rolta) under the not-for-profit Public Private Partnership (N-PPP) model, at a funding ratio of 50:35:15 respectively. Admission to undergraduate programmes is based on marks obtained in JEE Main, with seats allotted through JoSAA counselling. IIIT Kalyani holds the status of an Institute of National Importance (INI), conferred by the Cabinet in March 2017 under the IIIT Act. IIT Kharagpur serves as the mentor institute for IIIT Kalyani.

== Campus ==
The institute currently operates from a transit campus at Webel IT Park, 14 Adivasi Para, Near Buddha Park, Kalyani, Nadia, West Bengal – 741235. A permanent campus is under construction on 50 acres along the Kalyani Expressway on the outskirts of Kalyani town. In October 2021, the Board of Governors sanctioned ₹144 crore for construction of the new permanent campus.

The construction of the permanent campus is 98% physical progress reported. The institute is being developed on a 34.36-acre site provided by the West Bengal government under the Public-Private Partnership (PPP) model. While the project faced delays due to the COVID-19 pandemic affecting labor and supply chains, it is now close to completion.

== Organisation and administration ==
=== Governance ===
The institute is governed by a Board of Governors whose members include representatives of the Government of India (Ministry of Education), Government of West Bengal, industry partners, and eminent individuals from academia, industry, and civil society. Prof. Santanu Chattopadhyay serves as the Director of the Institute, having assumed charge on 16 December 2020.

=== Academic Units ===
- Computer Science and Engineering
- Electronics and Communication Engineering
- Humanities
- Mathematics
- Physics

== Academics ==
IIIT Kalyani follows a credit-based academic system that gives students the flexibility to progress at their own pace. The curriculum draws inspiration from IIT Kharagpur and other leading institutions, and is designed to address current and emerging industry demands. Faculty retain significant autonomy in designing and structuring courses, and interdisciplinary courses are offered collaboratively across academic units.

The institute currently offers the following programmes:

- B.Tech (CSE) – 118 seats
- B.Tech (ECE) – 60 seats
- B.Tech (AI & DS) – Artificial Intelligence and Data Science
- M.Tech – Online programme in Artificial Intelligence and Data Science; M.Tech in VLSI and Embedded Systems; M.Tech in Advanced Communication Systems and Signal Processing (admission via GATE score through CCMT)
- Ph.D – Full-time and part-time, across Engineering, Humanities, and Sciences; Post-Doctoral Fellowships available under the Visvesvaraya PhD Scheme

=== Admissions ===
Undergraduate admission is through JEE Main scores via JoSAA counselling and CSAB Special Rounds. Postgraduate admission to M.Tech programmes is through a valid GATE and NET-CSIR score via CCMT counselling.
