= Indian Institute of Information Technology, Nagpur =

Institute in Nagpur, Maharashtra

Coordinates: 20.9502513°N 79.0264028°E

- Type: Public–private partnership
- Established: July 2016
- Director: Dr. Prem Lal Patel
- Undergraduates: 2200+
- Location: Nagpur, Maharashtra, India
- Campus: 100 acres; Rural
- Acronym: IIITN
- Website: iiitn.ac.in

Indian Institute of Information Technology, Nagpur (abbreviated IIITN) is one of the Indian Institutes of Information Technology (IIIT) and an Institute of National Importance located in Nagpur, Maharashtra. The institute started functioning from July 2016. It offers Bachelor of Technology (B.Tech.) courses in Electronics and Communication Engineering and Computer Science and Engineering. The institute has shifted to its permanent campus, at Waranga Nagpur.

== Establishment ==
IIITN was approved by the Government of India's (GOI) Ministry of Human Resource Development (MHRD) in May 2015. IIITN has been set up on a Public–private partnership (PPP) basis. Fifty percent of the stakes are held by MHRD, whereas thirty-five percent is held by the Government of Maharashtra; the rest is held by industry partner Tata Consultancy Services.

VNIT was declared as IIITN's mentor institute, and VNIT director Narendra Chaudhari was appointed as IIITN's mentor director. The MHRD funded ₹3 crore (US$310,000) for setting up of the institute, whereas Government of Maharashtra funded ₹1.4 crore (US$150,000).

== Courses ==
Initially, IIITN offered two B.Tech. courses: Computer Science and Engineering (CSE) and Electronics and Communication Engineering (ECE), with a total capacity of 373 students (223 in CSE and 150 in ECE). Over the years, the institute expanded its academic offerings and infrastructure.

In 2022, IIITN increased its total student intake to 637 students by introducing four new specialized B.Tech. branches:

- CSE in Data Science and Analytics (DSA) (66 seats)
- CSE in Human Computer Interaction & Gaming Technology (HCIGT) (66 seats)
- CSE in Artificial Intelligence & Machine Learning (AIML) (66 seats)
- ECE in Internet of Things (IoT) (66 seats)

The total intake capacity now includes these specialized branches alongside the existing CSE and ECE programs. . The first ever batch capacity was of 40 students only. It plans to start Master of Technology (M.Tech.) and Doctor of Philosophy (PhD) courses from academic session of 2018–19.

== Campus ==
The institute has shifted to its permanent campus in Waranga, Nagpur on April, 2021. The hostel at IIITN is equipped with rooms and other everyday things required by the student. IIITN provides gyms and indoor sports facilities like Table Tennis, Chess and Carrom and outdoor sports like Badminton, Cricket, Volleyball, Basketball etc. Each Floor in hostel has its own common room with all indoor games facilities. The canteen at IIITN serves Indian food, the CRA along with the warden in-charge plans the menu for the canteen and inspect the quality and cleanliness from time to time. Alongside this, the campus has one canteen at academic block in campus and food stalls outside campus.
