= One Nation One Subscription =

One-stop digital library in India

- Products: Major international academic journals
- Country: India
- Prime Minister(s): Narendra Modi
- Ministry: Ministry of Education
- Launched: 1 January 2025; 20 months ago
- Budget: ₹6,000 crore

One Nation One Subscription (ONOS) is a national consortium of e-journal subscriptions in India with institutional access to global research in various academic disciplines where access to journals is centrally negotiated, funded and made accessible. The project is sponsored by the Government of India after the approval of One Nation One Subscription (ONOS) bill by the cabinet and has been operational since 1 January 2025. ₹6,000 crore (US$620 million) has been allocated to cover operation of the service from 2025 to 2027. The government's autonomous university libraries’ database called Information and Library Network Centre (INFLIBNET), which is a project by the University Grants Commission (UGC) is hosting the ONOS database. In the first year of operation, the service reported 110 million downloads with 10 million users and 5800 participating institutes.

ONOS is hosting over 13000 journals for more than 6300 government academic and R&D institutes covering nearly 18 million students, faculty and researchers.

== Content ==
This common platform hosts over 13,000 full-text journals published by 30 international publishers such as Elsevier Science Direct (including Lancet), Springer Nature, Wiley Blackwell Publishing, Taylor & Francis, IEEE, Sage Publishing, Bentham Science Publishers, BMJ Journals, Cambridge University Press Journals, Emerald Publishing Journals, ICE Publishing Journals, American Chemical Society, and American Mathematical Society.

== See also ==
- Open access
- Aaron Swartz
- Access to Knowledge movement
- Directory of Open Access Journals
