= Atal Bihari Vajpayee Indian Institute of Information Technology and Management =

Higher-education institute in Madhya Pradesh, India

- Motto: विश्वजीवनामृतं ज्ञानम्
- Motto in English: Knowledge is elixir for the world
- Type: Autonomous University
- Established: 1997; 29 years ago
- Budget: ₹800,000,000 (US$8.3 million)
- Chairman: Deepak Ghaisas
- Director: Sri Niwas Singh
- Faculty: 139 (full time) + visiting and guest faculty(1)
- Students: 1538
- Undergraduates: 1350
- Postgraduates: 150
- Doctoral students: 127
- Other students: 19
- Location: Gwalior, Madhya Pradesh, 474015, India; 26.248468°N 78.174592°E
- Campus: Urban, 160 acres (0.65 km^{2})
- Language: English
- Website: www.iiitm.ac.in

The Atal Bihari Vajpayee Indian Institute of Information Technology and Management (ABV-IIITM), is an institute of national importance and premiere higher-education institute located in Gwalior, Madhya Pradesh, India. Established in 1997 by Government of India, MHRD (Presently Ministry of Education (India)). Initially started as IIITM, this institute was prefixed with ABV in 2002 to honour the then Prime Minister Atal Bihari Vajpayee. It is recognized as an Institute of National Importance as it has been established under The Indian Institute of Information Technology Act 2014.

== Campus ==
The institute is located on a 160-acre (0.65 km^{2}) campus near Chena Fort. It is a residential campus as the faculty and its students live on campus. It houses several departmental blocks with academic block houses, lecture theatres, seminar halls, library, laboratories and faculty offices, administrative block, an open amphitheatre, indoor sports complex and the student hostels. There are three hostels for boys and one for girls. The campus has a variety of plants including those with medicinal properties. The institute initially operated from a temporary site in Institute of Technology and Science Gwalior and later shifted to its own facility.

=== Library ===
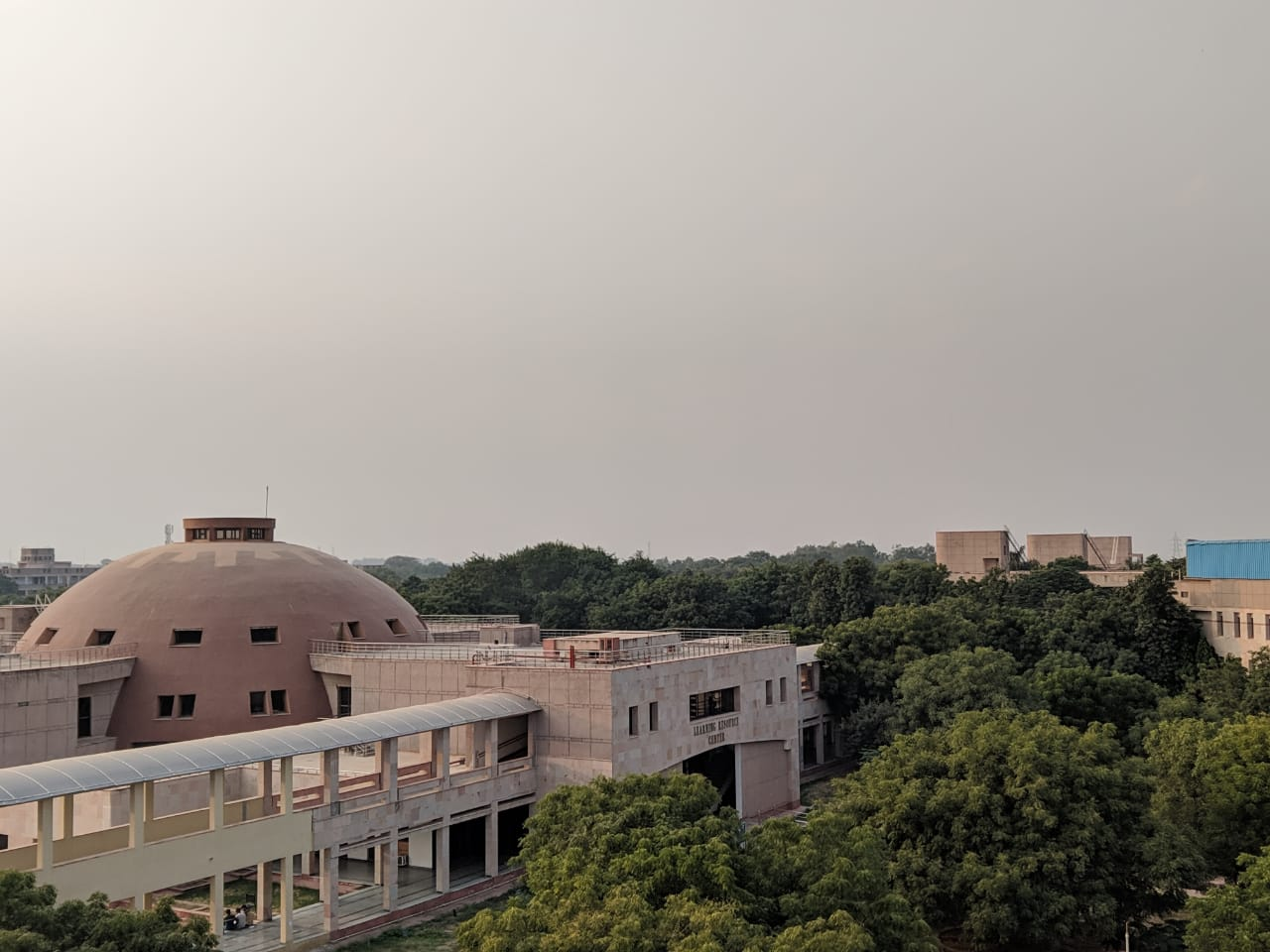
side view of library

The college was initially equipped with a main reference library with a capacity of 24,000 books and a reading room adjacent to it, inside the academic block itself. Recently, the college has opened a large three-story central library adjacent to the academic block that has centralized air-conditioning and has a capacity of 80,000 books. Moreover, e-resources and online journals are maintained as part of a digital library to further facilitate the students and scholars in their quest for knowledge. The library subscribes to journals, periodicals, and magazines in the area of IT and management. The library has videotapes and video CDs for use by the students.

The Ministry of Human Resource Development (MHRD) set up the "Indian National Digital Library in Engineering Sciences and Technology" (INDEST) consortium. This provides students with a collection of journals and industrial database like IEEE, EBSCO, CME, ABI/Inform complete, Association for Computing Machinery Digital Library, IEEE - IEEE/IET Electronic Library (IEL)|IEL Online, J-Gate Engineering and technology, ProQuest Science journals and Springer Verlag's link.

== Academics ==
=== Academic programmes ===
The institute offers various graduate and postgraduate programs, which include Master of Technology (MTech) in various information technology fields, Master of Business Administration (MBA), PhD, and a five-year integrated BTech/MTech or BTech/MBA program.

In 2017, the institute opened B.Tech. CSE program which is its first graduation course. B.Tech in Mathematics and Scientific Computing and B.Tech. in Electrical and Electronics Engineering were introduced in 2023. In addition, Management Development Programmes and Faculty Development Programmes are offered.

It has been collaborating with Google since 2008 on the development of updated academic curriculum and collaboration, under the direction of Siddhartha Paul Tiwari, in relation to emerging technologies.

=== Departments ===
- Information Technology
- Computer Science Engineering
- Electrical and Electronics
- Engineering Sciences
- Management Studies

=== Achievements ===
A team from the institute won the 2008 ACM ICPC Asia Regional Contest, an IT programming contest held in Kanpur.

=== Rankings ===
University rankings

Engineering – India
- NIRF (2022): 78
- NIRF (2023): 88
- NIRF (2024): 104

Business/Management – India
- NIRF (2022): 64
- NIRF (2023): 68
- NIRF (2024): 85

Placement Stats of 2024-2025 batch:

Participated companies in the 2024-2025 placement season:
