= Indian Institute of Information Technology, Design and Manufacturing, Kancheepuram =

Public university in Chennai, India

- Motto: Learning By Doing
- Type: Public technical and research institution
- Established: 2007; 19 years ago
- Chairperson: Dr. Sridhar Vembu
- Director: M. V. Kartikeyan
- Academic staff: 81
- Students: 1,967
- Undergraduates: 1,756
- Postgraduates: 72
- Doctoral students: 139
- Location: Chennai, Tamil Nadu, 600127, India; 12.8378745°N 80.1370940°E
- Campus: 51 acres (21 ha); Urban
- Colors: Cornflower Blue
- Nickname: IIITians
- Website: www.iiitdm.ac.in

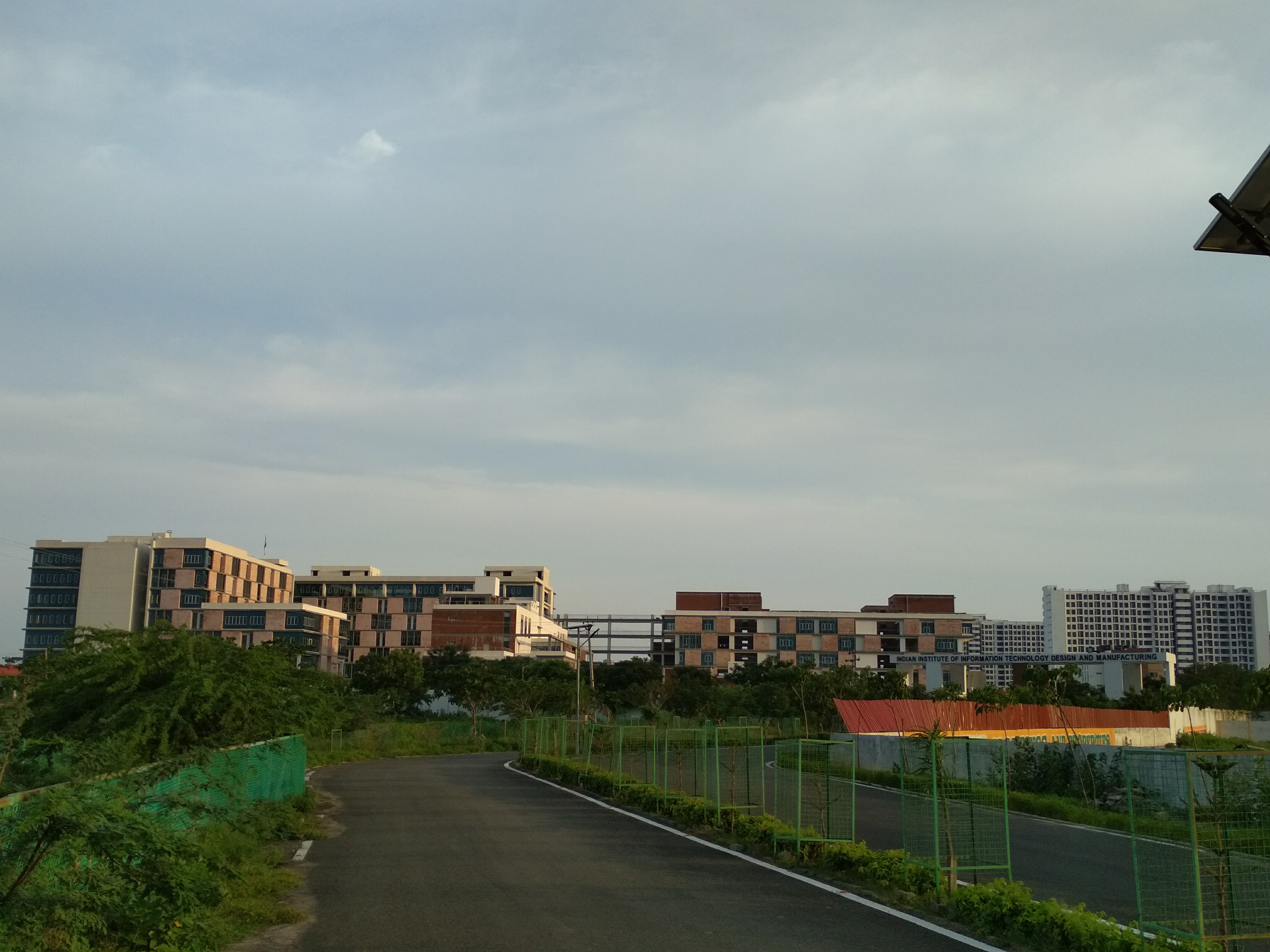
Indian Institute of Information Technology, Design and Manufacturing, Kancheepuram

Indian Institute of Information Technology, Design and Manufacturing, Kancheepuram (IIITDM Kancheepuram) is a public technical and research institution established in 2007 by the Ministry of Education, Government of India, to pursue design and manufacturing oriented engineering education and research, and to promote the competitive advantage of Indian products in global markets.

== History ==
IIITDM Kancheepuram was established in 2007 and moved to its permanent campus at Melakottaiyur Village, near Kandigai, off the Vandalur–Kelambakkam Road, Chennai, in 2011. It was declared an Institute of National Importance (INI) by the Ministry of Human Resource Development in July 2011, becoming the first IIIT to be accorded this status. The IIIT Bill 2014, passed by Parliament on 1 December 2014, further reaffirmed INI status upon the five centrally funded IIITs including IIITDM Kancheepuram.

== Admissions ==
=== B.Tech and Dual Degree ===
Admission to B.Tech and Dual Degree (B.Tech and M.Tech) programmes is through JoSAA/CSAB based on JEE Main rank. Admissions for foreign nationals are conducted through the Direct Admission of Students Abroad (DASA) and Study in India programmes.

=== M.Tech ===
Admission to M.Tech is through CCMT based on GATE score.

=== M.Des ===
Admission to M.Des is through the CEED.

== Departments ==
- Computer Science and Engineering
- Electronics and Communication Engineering
- Mechanical Engineering
- School of Interdisciplinary Design and Innovation
- Sciences and Humanities

== Academics ==
=== Academic programmes ===
The institute offers B.Tech, Dual Degree (B.Tech and M.Tech), M.Des, M.Tech, and Ph.D. programmes.

==== B.Tech ====
- Computer Science and Engineering
- Computer Science and Engineering with Major in AI
- Electronics and Communication Engineering
- Mechanical Engineering
- Smart Manufacturing
- Design Engineering
- Engineering Physics

==== Dual Degree ====
- B.Tech and M.Tech in Computer Science and Engineering
- B.Tech in Electronics and Communication Engineering and M.Tech in Communication Systems
- B.Tech in Electronics and Communication Engineering and M.Tech in VLSI Design
- B.Tech in Mechanical Engineering and M.Tech in AI and Robotics

==== M.Tech ====
- Computer Science and Engineering (Spl: Data Science and Artificial Intelligence)
- Electronics and Communication Engineering (Spl: Communication Systems)
- Electronics and Communication Engineering (Spl: Microelectronics and VLSI Systems)
- Electronics and Communication Engineering (Spl: RF and Microwave Engineering)
- Mechanical Engineering (Spl: Mechanical Systems Design)
- Mechanical Engineering (Spl: Smart Manufacturing)

==== M.Des ====
- Integrated Product Design

==== Ph.D ====
- Computer Science Engineering
- Electronics and Communications Engineering (including Electrical Engineering, Biotechnology, and Biomedical Engineering)
- Mechanical Engineering
- Mathematics
- Physics
- English
- Interdisciplinary Product Design

== Rankings ==
University and college rankings

Engineering – India
- NIRF (2023): 101–150
- NIRF (2024): 101–150

IIITDM Kancheepuram was placed in the band "Excellent" (Rank 11–21) among Institutes of National Importance in ARIIA 2021. It was ranked 8th in NIRF Innovation Rankings 2023.

== Student life ==
=== Institute newsletter ===
IIITDM Kancheepuram publishes a semi-regular institute newsletter called Margdarshan, providing a platform for students to share articles and views on campus life.

=== Festivals ===
==== Samgatha ====
Samgatha is IIITDM's annual inter-college cultural festival held in March. Its name derives from the Sanskrit word meaning "Confluence" and comprises around 40 events.

==== Vashisht ====
Vashisht is IIITDM's annual inter-college technical festival held in October. It was first conducted in 2019.

=== Student bodies ===
The Student Affairs Council (SAC) is the representative student body of IIITDM Kancheepuram. It includes divisions for academic affairs, technical affairs, cultural affairs, alumni affairs, general affairs, hostel affairs, mess affairs, placement affairs, research affairs, and sports affairs. These divisions address student-related matters such as academic support, technical and cultural activities, hostel and mess issues, placement support, research guidance, and sports facilities.

==== SSG ====
The Social Service Group (SSG) is an institute-sponsored organisation that undertakes social and environmental initiatives including health camps, blood donation drives, and cleanliness campaigns.
