= International Institute of Information Technology, Naya Raipur =

State-funded institute in Naya Raipur, Chhattisgarh, India

Dr. Shyama Prasad Mukherjee International Institute of Information Technology
- Motto in English: Knowledge gives us Intense Peace
- Type: Public University
- Established: 2015; 11 years ago
- Affiliations: UGC, AICTE
- Chairperson: Saurabh Srivastava
- Director: Dr. Om Prakash Vyas
- Location: Naya Raipur, Chhattisgarh, India
- Campus: Urban
- Website: www.iiitnr.ac.in

International Institute of Information Technology, Naya Raipur (IIIT-NR), officially Dr. Shyama Prasad Mukherjee International Institute of Information Technology, Naya Raipur, is a state-funded institute in Naya Raipur, Chhattisgarh, India. The institute is focused on research and development in Information Technology (IT) and associated disciplines.

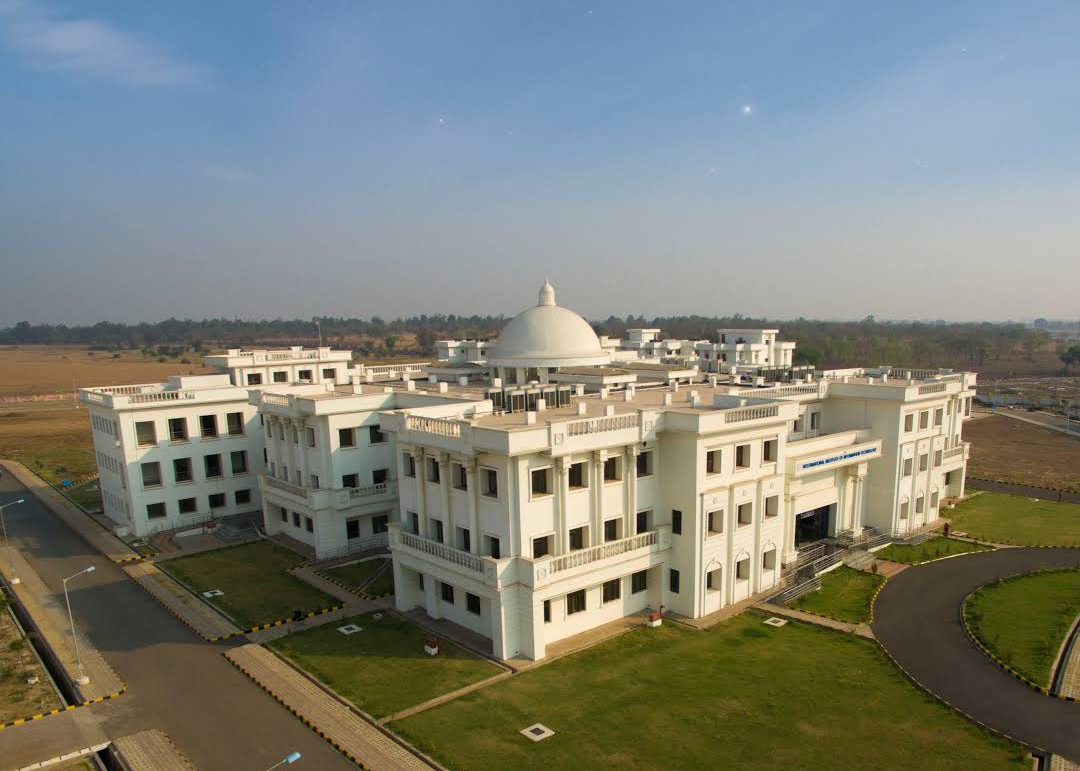
IIIT, Naya Raipur administrative building

== History ==
The institute was established by the International Institute of Information Technology University Act, 2013 of the Government of Chhattisgarh, and is a joint venture of Government of Chhattisgarh and NTPC Ltd. It is a state university recognized by University Grants Commission, New Delhi.

== Admission Process ==
Students are required to submit JEE Main scores to be admitted. There are around 100 seats across each of the three branches in BTech courses.

IIIT-NR's reservation criteria holds 50% of seats for students who are residents of Chhattisgarh state, and 15% seats for children of NTPC employees. The remaining 35% seats are filled through the JOSAA rounds conducted by Joint Seat Allocation Authority.

== Academics ==
IIIT-NR runs undergraduate programs for B.Tech. This includes degrees in Computer science and engineering, Data science and Artificial intelligence, Electronics and communication engineering Postgraduate M. Tech and MS(R) programmes. In addition, it also offers Ph.D programs in various fields.

== Hostels ==
IIIT Naya Raipur has 5 hostels: Raman House for first year boys, Bose House for second year boys, Ramanujan House for third and fourth year boys, Shabri Hostel for first year girls, and Bhabha House for rest of the girls.

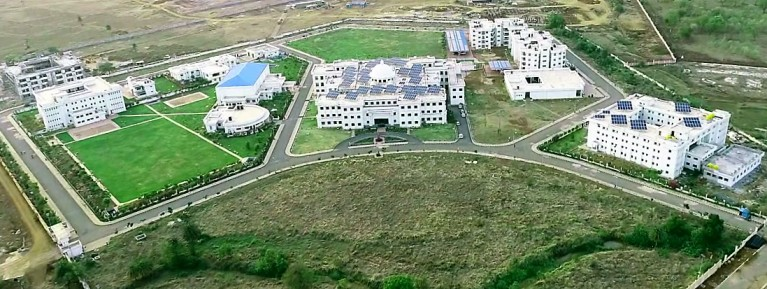
Aerial view of IIIT, Naya Raipur

== Student life ==
Technovate is a non-profit fest organised by the students of IIIT Naya Raipur. It began as a techno-cultural fest in 2016, and draws thousands of visitors from colleges all over India. The three-day fest held every year in month of February or March. The fest includes technical events, cultural events, informal events and celebrity night.

Aarambh is a sports fest of IIIT Naya Raipur organised in the month of October. Participating students are sold to various teams via auction. Aarambh includes various outdoor sports such as football, cricket, volleyball, kabaddi, indoor sports like chess and also E-Sports like Valorant and CS-GO.
