= Centrally Funded Technical Institutes =

Indian academic instirutions

The Centrally Funded Technical Institutes (CFTIs) are a list of 122 academic institutions in India that are funded by the Ministry of Education (MoE), Government of India.

== Institutes ==
Centrally Funded Technical Institutes
Name of the CFTI		Number of CFTI		Ref.
Indian Institutes of Technology (IITs)		23		
Indian Institutes of Management (IIMs)		20		
Indian Institute of Science (IISc)		1		
Indian Institutes of Science Education and Research (IISERs)		7		
National Institutes of Technology (NITs)		32		
Indian Institutes of Information Technology (IIITs)	MoE funded	5	25	
Indian Institutes of Information Technology (IIITs)	Public private partnership (PPP) mode	20	25	
National Institutes of Technical Teacher's Training & Research (NITTTRs)		4		
Schools of Planning and Architecture (SPA)		3		
North Eastern Regional Institute of Science and Technology (NERIST)		1		
Sant Longowal Institute of Engineering and Technology (SLIET)		1		
National Institute of Industrial Engineering (NITIE)		1		
National Institute of Advanced Manufacturing Technology (NIAMT)		1		
Ghani Khan Choudhury Institute of Engineering & Technology (GKCIET)		1		
Central Institute of Technology, Kokrajhar		1		
Total		122		
