= All India Institute of Medical Sciences, Nagpur =

Medical higher education institute in India

- Motto: Swasthyam sarwarthasadhanam(Sanskrit)
- Motto in English: Everything can be achieved with Good Health
- Type: Public
- Established: September 6, 2018; 7 years ago
- Budget: ₹148.93 crore (US$15 million) (FY2022–23 est.)
- President: Dr. Anant Phandhare
- Director: Dr. Prashant P. Joshi
- Academic staff: 166 (2024)
- Students: 595 (2024)
- Undergraduates: 524 (2024)
- Postgraduates: 71 (2024)
- Location: MIHAN, Nagpur, Maharashtra, India; 21.0386°N 79.0238°E
- Campus: Urban
- Website: aiimsnagpur.edu.in

All India Institute of Medical Sciences, Nagpur (AIIMS Nagpur) is a medical research public higher education institute located at the Multi-modal International Cargo Hub and Airport at Nagpur (MIHAN), Nagpur, Maharashtra, India. It is one of the four "Phase-IV" All India Institutes of Medical Sciences (AIIMS) announced in July 2014. It is an institution under the Ministry of Health and Family Welfare, which is part of the Government of India.

Dr Prashant P. Joshi is the current Executive Director of the All India Institute of Medical Sciences, Nagpur (AIIMS Nagpur). He was appointed to the position in February 2024.

== History ==
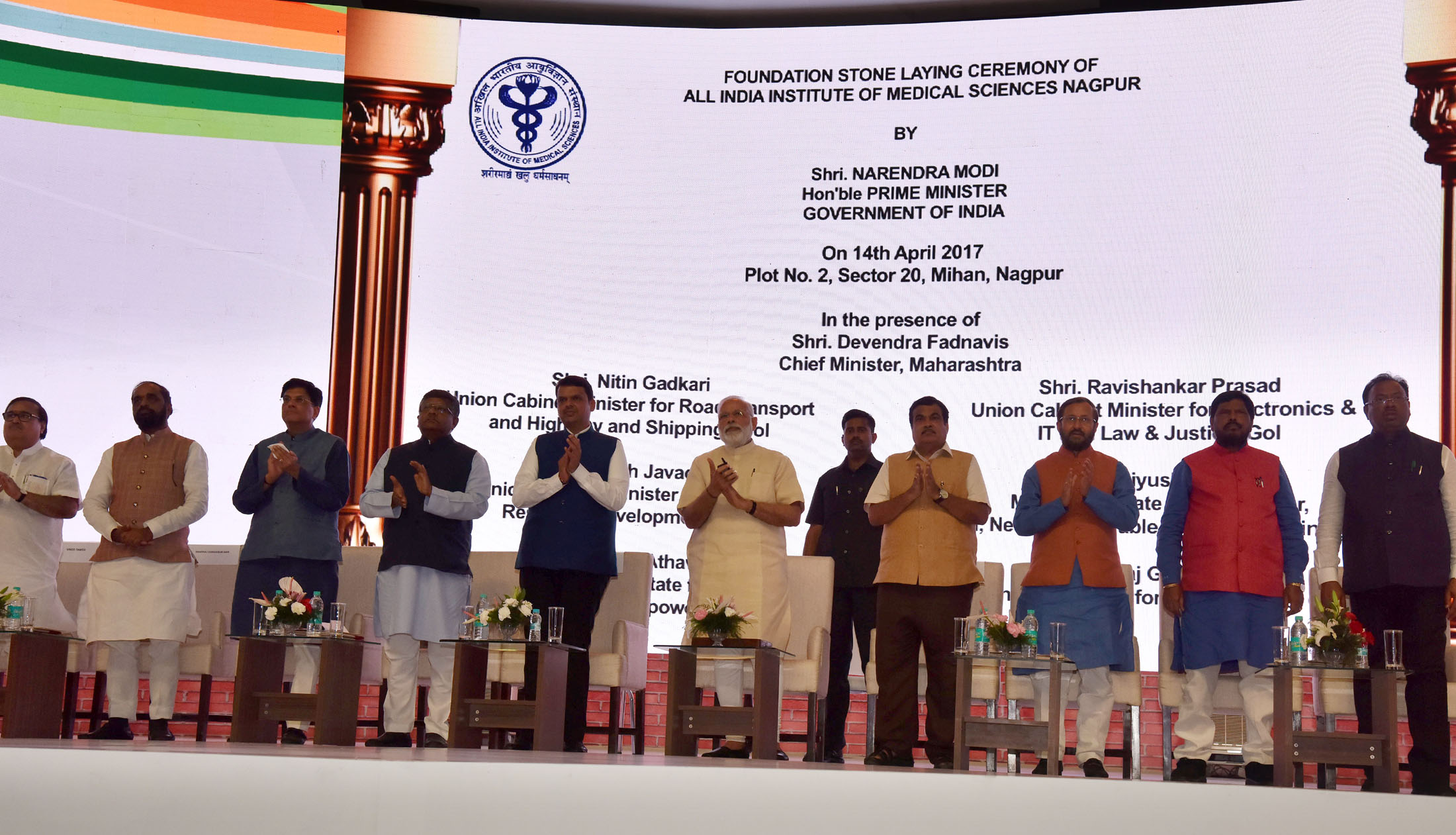
Foundation stone laying ceremony of AIIMS Nagpur

In July 2014, in the budget speech for 2014–15, the Minister of Finance Arun Jaitley announced a budget of ₹500 crore (equivalent to ₹799 crore or US$83 million in 2023) for setting up four new AIIMS, in Andhra Pradesh, West Bengal, the Vidarbha region of Maharashtra and the Purvanchal region in Uttar Pradesh, the so-called "Phase-IV" institutes. In October 2015 the AIIMS at Nagpur was approved by the cabinet at a cost of ₹1,577 crore (equivalent to ₹24 billion or US$250 million in 2023). Construction work on the permanent campus started in September 2017. Meanwhile, AIIMS Nagpur has commenced the academic session 2018-19 from temporary campus at Government Medical College and Hospital, Nagpur.

== College Fest ==
HALLUCIA is AIIMS Nagpur's Pan-India official annual fest organised by the students. It hosts a cluster of events including cultural events (dance, music, dramatics, arts, fashions show etc.), sports (cricket, football, basketball, volleyball etc.) and literary (debate, pitching, quiz pitching, quiz etc.) events which are competed building doctors from all from all across the country. Riveting performances, enchanting social nights featuring famous Bollywood Singers like Mohit Chauhan, Sunidhi Chauhan, etc. and frenzied crowds are all a part of HALLUCIA.The first edition was held in 2021.The latest edition of the festival was held in the month of November 2024.

== See also ==
- Education in India
- List of medical colleges in India
