= Indian Institute of Information Technology, Kota =

Institute of National Importance in Kota, Rajasthan

- Motto in English: Work is Worship
- Type: Public–Private Partnership
- Established: 2013; 13 years ago
- Director: Narayana Prasad Padhy
- Location: Kota, Rajasthan, India; 26.8640°N 75.8108°E
- Campus: Urban
- Website: iiitkota.ac.in

Indian Institute of Information Technology Kota (IIIT, Kota) is one of the Indian Institutes of Information Technology proposed to be located at Ranpur near Kota, Rajasthan. It is spread over 100.37 acres, IIIT Kota is a Joint venture of the Ministry of Education (MoE) Government of India, Government of Rajasthan with Industries in Public-Private Partnership model. First batch of IIIT Kota has graduated in the year 2017. IIITK offers technical courses for CSE and ECE branches, with creative project courses. Every year IIITK celebrates its Foundation Day in April. After the IIIT Act was passed in the Parliament in 2017, IIITK has become an "Institute of National Importance", equalling in status with the NITs and IITs, with power of offering degrees officially.

== History ==
The academic session of IIIT Kota started from its temporary campus at Malaviya National Institute of Technology Jaipur from year 2013.

IIIT Kota will be welcoming its first batch of 2023 to the newly built campus in Ranpur Kota, Phase I construction is about to be accomplished while Phase 2 Construction is still going on.

== Hostels ==
1st Year(Freshers) Students will be accommodated in Three Bed Rooms but due to lack of accommodation and increase of the number of seats , 4 freshers are living in an ideal room of capacity 3 .

2nd Year(Sophomores) Students will be accommodated in Two Bed Rooms.

3rd and 4th Year Students will be accommodated in Single Bed Rooms.

== Seats ==
There are 330 seats in IIIT Kota as of 2025. Currently seat matrix in IIIT Kota is:
Computer Science & Engineering: 180 seats
Electronics & Communication Engineering: 90 seats

Artificial Intelligence and Data Engineering: 60 Seats
Admission process in IIIT Kota is through JEE Mains.

== Building Status at Permanent Campus ==
IIIT Kota Establishes Permanent Home

Indian Institute of Information Technology, Kota (IIIT Kota) has started its operation by opening its doors on its very own campus in Kota in 2023. This marks a significant shift from its initial years, where it functioned within the premises of its mentor institute, Malaviya National Institute of Technology (MNIT) Jaipur since 2013.

Phase I Nears Completion,

The institute is near completion of Phase-I construction. This crucial phase has materialized into key facilities that will serve the student body. These include an Academic Building, along with dedicated and well-equipped hostels for both boys and girls.

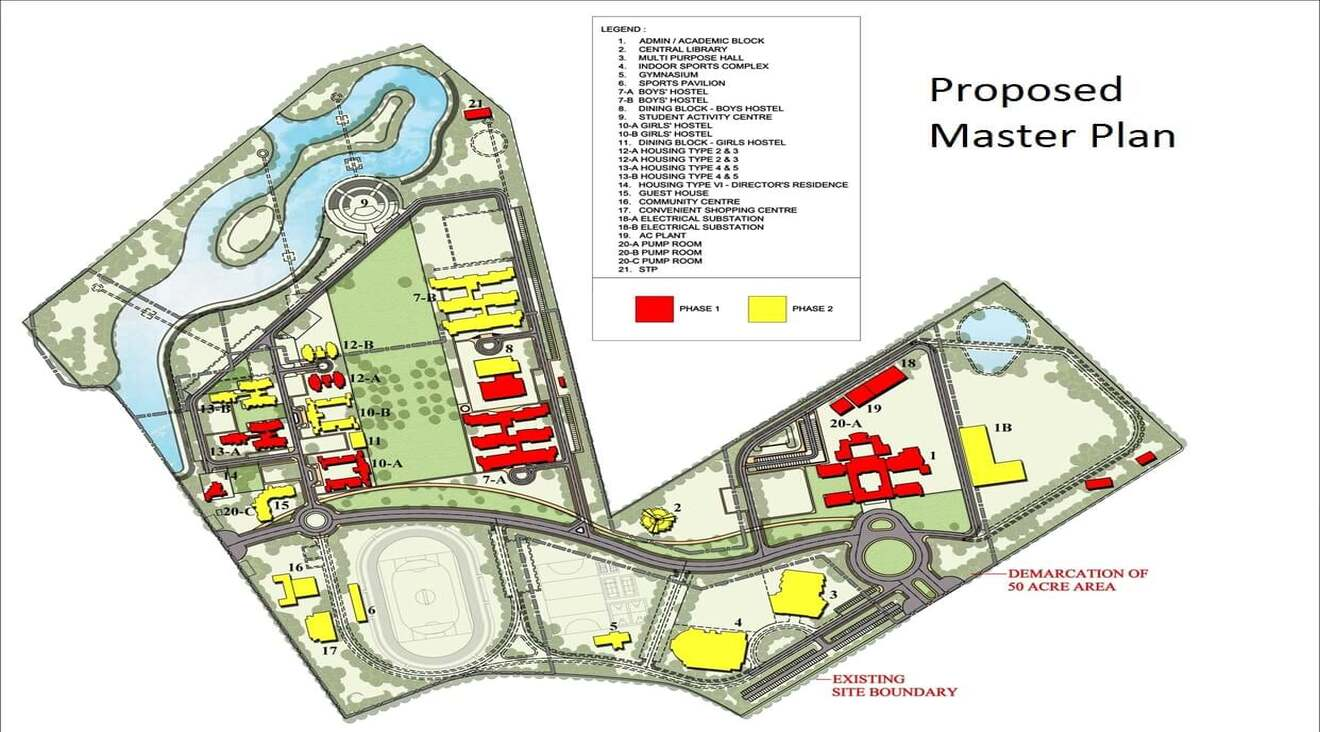

== Building and Work Committee Report ==
Decisions of 1st Meeting of BWC
Decisions of 2nd Meeting of BWC
Decisions of 3rd Meeting of BWC
Decisions of 4th Meeting of BWC
Decisions of 5th Meeting of BWC Decisions of 6th Meeting of BWC
