= Bachelor of Technology =

Type of undergraduate qualification

- Acronym: B.Tech.
- Type: Bachelor's degree
- Duration: 3 to 4 years

A Bachelor of Technology (B.Tech.) is a bachelor's degree that is awarded for programmes usually related to engineering technology.

== Countries ==
=== Australia ===
In Australia, the Bachelor of Technology degree is offered by RMIT University, Edith Cowan University, Curtin University and certain private institutions.

=== Canada ===
In Canada, the degree is offered by British Columbia Institute of Technology, Thompson Rivers University, Northern Alberta Institute of Technology, McMaster University, Seneca College, Algonquin College, and Marine Institute of Memorial University of Newfoundland.

=== India ===
The degree of Bachelor of Technology in India is an undergraduate academic degree conferred after the completion of a four-year full-time engineering programme from All India Council for Technical Education recognised institute. The B.Tech. degree is generally awarded by Indian Institutes of Technology (IITs), National Institutes of Technology (NITs), Indian Institutes of Information Technology (IIITs), Government Funded Technical Institutes (GFTIs), or other Centrally Funded Technical Institutes (CFTIs) and private deemed universities in various engineering disciplines. This degree is generally equivalent to a Bachelor of Engineering offered in other affiliated engineering colleges of state collegiate universities or a Bachelor of Science in Engineering or Bachelor of Engineering in the United States and Europe.

Eligibility for a B.Tech. programme in India typically requires candidates to have completed their higher secondary education (10+2) with mandatory subjects such as mathematics, physics, chemistry, or other technical subjects. Institutions often set a minimum aggregate percentage requirement, usually 75% in 12th grade and the Joint Entrance Examination (JEE) Main is a prominent entrance exam for B.Tech. admissions, comprising questions in mathematics, physics and chemistry. JEE Advanced is the subsequent exam for those trying to enter the IITs. Admission to NITs, IIITs, other GFTIs, and deemed universities are based on JEE Main scores.

=== Pakistan ===
The National Technology Council (NTC) of Pakistan is responsible for accrediting 4-year technology degree programmes in universities. This ensures quality education that meets international standards.

The National Technology Council of Pakistan also maintains a register of technologists with different categories based on qualifications and experience. Graduates with 4-year degrees can register as "Graduate Engineering Technologists" until December 31, 2022. After that, only graduates from NTC-accredited programmes will be eligible. Those with 5 years of experience can register as "Professional Engineering Technologist".

=== Singapore ===
In Singapore, the B.Tech. degree programme is offered by the School of Continuing and Lifelong Education of the National University of Singapore through its "Bachelor of Technology in Engineering (BTech in Engineering)" programme.

=== United States ===
In New York State, the degree is offered by the New York City College of Technology, part of the City University of New York. Multiple academic departments of the college offers course resulting in the degree upon graduation.
