= Joint Seat Allocation Authority =

Indian education agency

Joint Seat Allocation Authority (JoSAA)
- Organization of Ministry of Education, MHRD, Government of India

- Joint Seat Allocation Authority

Agency overview
- Formed: 2015 (11 years ago)
- Jurisdiction: Government of India
- Headquarters: Office of Organizing Committee of IIT & NIT
- Agency executives: Chairman of JoSAA; Chairman of IIT Council; Council of NITSER; CSAB; Council of GFTI; Engineering Council of India; Council of Architecture; MHRD, India
- Parent department: Ministry of Education (India), New Delhi.
- Website: josaa.nic.in

The Joint Seat Allocation Authority, also known as JoSAA, is an agency established by India's Ministry of Education to manage and regulate the admission to 110 tertiary institutes administered by the Indian government.

== History ==
The agency was established by the ministry in 2018 to manage the allocation of seats for admission to 100 Indian Institutes of Technology (IIT), National Institutes of Technology (NIT), Indian Institutes of Information Technology (IIIT) and Government Funded Technical Institutes, starting with the 2018-19 academic year. It is made up of representatives from the ministry's Joint Admission Board and Central Seat Allocation Board, which are responsible for the allocation of seats to IITs and the other institutes respectively. In 2018, the agency announced 100 institutes and two special spot vacant seats by CSAB. Admission to the Institute of Chemical Technology Mumbai-IndianOil Odisha Campus is also carried out by JoSAA since 2021.

== Spot round controversy ==
According to industry reports, between 3,000 and 5,000 seats in the institutes have been left vacant following the 2016 counseling process. Despite calls for a spot round of allocations to fill the vacancies, the agency has announced that a spot round will not be conducted.

== See also ==
- National Testing Agency
