= Suparna Diwakar =

Indian educationalist and social entrepreneur

- Born: India
- Occupations: Educationalist, social entrepreneur, educational consultant
- Organizations: School of Inspired Leadership (SOIL); Indian School of Development Management (ISDM); Rishihood University; Azim Premji Foundation; UNICEF; MYRADA; Adamya Chethana Foundation; Sewa International
- Known for: Contributions to school curriculum development in India

Suparna Diwakar is an Indian educationalist, social entrepreneur, and development professional associated with curriculum development initiatives in India. She was formerly involved in the development of school-level social science textbooks for the National Council of Educational Research and Training (NCERT).

== Career ==
Diwakar has worked in the field of school education and curriculum development, particularly in social science education. She has been associated with the National Council of Educational Research and Training (NCERT) as part of teams involved in the preparation and revision of school textbooks. Her work has included contributions to pedagogical content and academic resources intended for school-level learners.

She has also been involved in educational consulting and social sector initiatives related to curriculum design, teacher support, and capacity-building in education. Her work includes collaboration with academic and non-profit organisations working in the education and development sectors.

In addition to her work with NCERT, Diwakar has been associated with the School of Inspired Leadership (SOIL) and the Indian School of Development Management (ISDM), where she has contributed to teaching, training, and programme development in areas related to education and leadership in the social sector.

She has also been associated with organisations including the Azim Premji Foundation, UNICEF, the Tata Institute of Social Sciences, and the Indian Institute of Science in consulting, collaborative, or project-based roles related to education and development.

Diwakar has been associated with Rishihood University, where she has contributed to academic and programme development at the Rashtram School of Public Leadership.

She has been a member of a task force constituted by the Government of Karnataka for the implementation of the National Education Policy (NEP) 2020 in the state.

Earlier in her career, she was associated with non-governmental organisations such as MYRADA, Adamya Chetana and Sewa International, working on development and education-related initiatives.

Her professional work spans curriculum design, development of teaching-learning materials, and support for educators through training and resource development.

== Textbook controversy (2026) ==
=== Background ===
In 2026, Diwakar was among the contributors to a Class 8 social science textbook titled Exploring Society: India and Beyond, which became the subject of proceedings before the Supreme Court of India.

The textbook included a section discussing issues related to institutional accountability in the judiciary.

=== Supreme Court proceedings ===
Following objections to the content, the Supreme Court took suo motu cognisance and issued directions concerning the use and circulation of the material pending further proceedings.

The Court further directed the Union and state governments to disassociate from the authors involved in the chapter. Diwakar, along with Michel Danino and Alok Prasanna Kumar, was among those named in this direction.

Following the Court's order, NCERT reconstituted its National Syllabus and Teaching Learning Material Committee (NSTC), removing members associated with the chapter, including Diwakar.

According to The Indian Express:

The court described the chapter on the judiciary as a “calculated move to undermine and demean the dignity of the judiciary”, and imposed a “complete blanket ban” on further publication, reprinting or digital dissemination of the textbook.

— The Indian Express, 9 April 2026

The matter remained under judicial consideration at the time, with further proceedings pending.

=== Responses and reactions ===
The developments were reported in multiple media outlets and led to wider public discussion on questions relating to educational content, institutional representation, and academic freedom.

In April 2026, a group of academics wrote to President Droupadi Murmu seeking intervention in the matter, expressing concern that the actions taken could have implications for academic freedom.

== Selected works ==
=== Articles and essays ===
- Diwakar, Suparna. "Suparna Diwakar – Contributor page". India Development Review.
- Diwakar, Suparna. "Reimagining education through relationships and context". India Development Review.

=== Educational contributions ===
- Contributions to school-level social science textbooks developed by the National Council of Educational Research and Training (NCERT), including Exploring Society: India and Beyond (Class 8).

== See also ==
- National Council of Educational Research and Training
- National Education Policy 2020
- Education in India
- Curriculum development
- Rishihood University
- Tata Institute of Social Sciences
