= Ananth Kumar =

Indian politician (1959–2018)

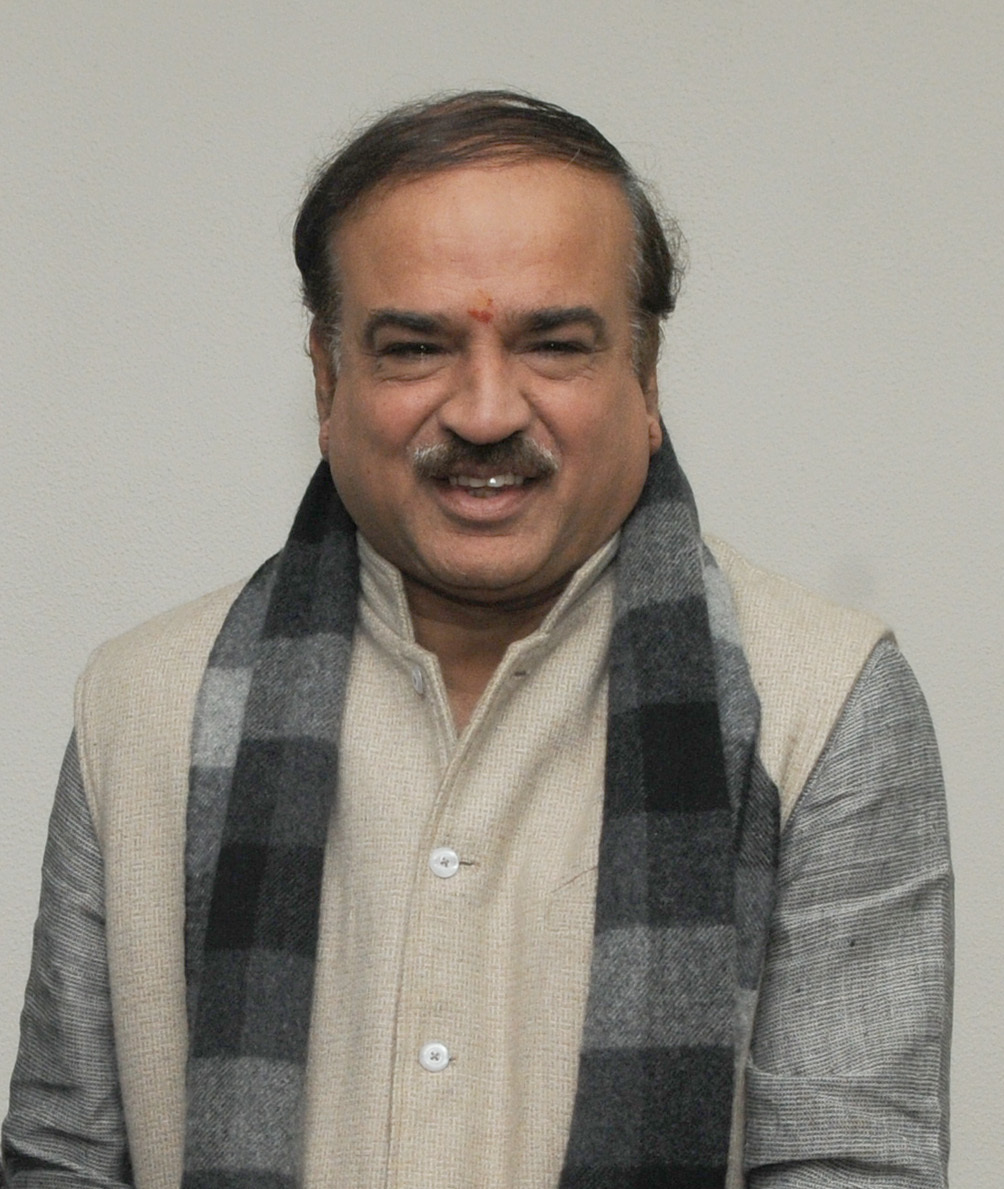
- Kumar in 2015

Cabinet Minister, Government of India
- In office 26 May 2014 – 12 November 2018
- Prime Minister: Narendra Modi
- Ministry: Term
- Parliamentary Affairs: 5 July 2016 – 12 November 2018
- Chemicals and Fertilizers: 26 May 2014 – 12 November 2018
- In office 13 October 1999 – 12 July 2003
- Prime Minister: Atal Bihari Vajpayee
- Ministry: Term
- Urban Development: 1 September 2001 – 12 July 2003
- Tourism: 2 February 2000 – 1 September 2001
- Culture: 13 October 1999 – 1 September 2001
- Youth Affairs & Sports: 13 October 1999 – 2 February 2000
- In office 19 March 1998 – 13 October 1999
- Prime Minister: Atal Bihari Vajpayee
- Ministry: Term
- Tourism: 30 January 1999 – 13 October 1999
- Civil Aviation: 19 March 1998 – 13 October 1999

Member of Parliament, Lok Sabha
- In office 10 May 1996 – 12 November 2018
- Preceded by: K. Venkatagiri Gowda
- Succeeded by: Tejasvi Surya
- Constituency: Bangalore South, Karnataka

President of Bharatiya Janata Party, Karnataka
- In office 26 June 2003 – 31 December 2004
- Preceded by: B.S. Yediyurappa
- Succeeded by: Jagadish Shettar

Personal details
- Born: Hegannahalli Narayana Shastry Ananth Kumar; 22 July 1959 Bangalore, Mysore State, India
- Died: 12 November 2018 (aged 59) Bengaluru, Karnataka, India
- Party: Bharatiya Janata Party
- Spouse: Tejaswini Kumar (m. 1989)
- Children: 2
- Education: Karnatak University
- Website: ananth.org

Hegannahalli Narayana Shastry Ananth Kumar (22 July 1959 – 12 November 2018) was an Indian politician who served as 1st Minister of Culture from 1999 to 2001. He was the Minister of Chemicals and Fertilizers, Parliamentary Affairs of India from 2014 until his death in 2018. Ananth Kumar was an MP from South Bangalore 6 times, Minister of Chemicals and fertilizers from 26 May 2014, and Parliamentary affairs from 2016. He was a member of the Parliament for over two decades, having been elected to the Lok Sabha, the lower house, from Bangalore South, from 1996 until his death. He also served as Minister for Civil Aviation, Tourism, Sports, Urban Development, and Poverty Alleviation.

== Early life ==
Ananth Kumar was born in a middle-class Brahmin family at Bangalore, Sheshadripuram, Karnataka, and moved to Hubli in 1979. His father, H. N. Narayan Shastry, was employed with the Indian Railways. His family settled in Hubli in 1979–80. His mother Smt Girija Shastry was a social worker associated with the Bharatiya Jana Sangh. She served as the deputy mayor of the Hubli-Dharwad Municipal Corporation between 1985 and 1986. Kumar completed his matriculation in Lamington School and pre-university course in science PC Jabin College in Hubli. He earned bachelor's degree in arts from Kadasiddeshwar Arts College, affiliated to the Karnatak University, and in Laws from JSS Law college, both in Hubli.

Kumar joined the Rashtriya Swayamsevak Sangh (RSS) in 1973 and took part in the movement started by Jayaprakash Narayan the following year. He was jailed in the Hubli sub-jail for a period of over 40 days during the emergency.

== Politics ==
Ananth Kumar was a member of RSS' student wing, the Akhil Bharatiya Vidyarthi Parishad (ABVP). He was elected as the State Secretary of the ABVP. He later became its National Secretary in 1985. In 1987, he joined BJP and was nominated as the State President of Bharatiya Janata Yuva Morcha. He was then made National Secretary of the party in 1996.

Ananth Kumar was elected from Bangalore South Lok Sabha constituency to the 11th Lok Sabha in 1996. He was re-elected and was inducted into the Second Vajpayee ministry. In 1999, he was re-elected to a third consecutive term and became a cabinet minister in the National Democratic Alliance government. He handled various ministries like Tourism, Sports & Youth Affairs, Culture, Urban Development and Poverty Alleviation.

Ananth Kumar became the President of the Karnataka state unit of BJP in 2003. It became the single largest party in the Legislative Assembly and won the majority number of Lok Sabha seats in 2004 in Karnataka. In 2004, he was appointed National General Secretary of the BJP.

On 26 May 2014, Kumar was appointed Minister of Chemicals and Fertilizers in the cabinet of the current Indian Prime Minister Narendra Modi. In the 2016 reshuffle, he was given the additional charge of Parliamentary Affairs.

=== Lok Sabha electoral performance ===
Year	Winner	Party	Losing candidate	Party
2014	Ananth Kumar	BJP	Nandan Nilekani	INC
2009	Ananth Kumar	BJP	K Byre Gowda	INC
2004	Ananth Kumar	BJP	Krishnappa M	INC
1999	Ananth Kumar	BJP	B K Hariprasad	INC
1998	Ananth Kumar	BJP	D P Sharma	INC
1996	Ananth Kumar	BJP	Varalakshmi Gundu Rao	INC

== Governance ==
When Ananth Kumar was minister of Chemicals and fertilizers, he worked to reduce the prices of coronary stents that would help heart patients to an average benefit of close to a lakh. As the minister for chemicals and fertilizers, Kumar implemented 100% mandatory neem-coating of urea, in a move that was expected to save ₹ 6,500 crore annually in government subsidy or about ₹ 10,000 in total, by stopping diversion for industrial usage, apart from additional benefit of slowing the release of nitrogen, thus reducing the overall consumption.

Ananth Kumar mandated price reduction by 69% on Knee Implants- from ₹1.5 to 2.5 lakh to the new price of ₹54,500. Under his guidance, number of Jan Aushadhi Kendras increased to over 4300 all over India (as on 1 November 2018) from 89 in May 2014. He launched Suvidha – Bio-degradable & environment friendly sanitary pads at just ₹2.50 per piece from 5 June 2018, on the occasion of International women's day (8 Mar 2018).

He launched an initiative to revive 6 closed fertilizer plants with over 48,000 cr investment, along with coal and oil & natural gas ministry.

Ananth Kumar signed an agreement for an International airport in Bangalore and took steps to improve the facilities in the HAL airport as the civil aviation minister in the Vajpayee government.

Ananth Kumar formulated a transport policy in which cities with more than 10 lakh people would have metros. He had worked for the approval of the Bengaluru Metro project by the Vajpayee cabinet.

Ananth Kumar, Sushma Swaraj, M Venkaiah Naidu, Arun Jaitley were called "Delhi-4" or "D4" under the leadership of veteran L.K Advani, as they were based in Delhi and took care of various responsibilities in the party.

He played his part in passing the GST (Goods and Services Tax) bill in July 2017. When NDA did not have a sufficient majority, Shri Ananth Kumar had convinced the other legislators regarding the importance of GST (Goods and Services Tax) to launch the bill.

In 1998 Shri Ananth Kumar launched www.raktadan.org/ and www.ananth.org. He became the first Indian MP to launch his own website to serve his constituency.

He was known as the Delhi Face of Karnataka. Whenever representatives from Karnataka from any party came to him in Delhi, he would contact the concerned officials and do everything he could to resolve their issues.

== Personal life ==
=== Social work ===
He along with his wife, Tejaswini, founded Adamya Chethana Foundation, a nonprofit organisation for social service. It was set up in 1998 in memory of Girija Shastry, mother of Ananth Kumar. It supports underprivileged children with food in schools through the Midday Meal Scheme. About 2,00,000 meals are served daily.

He launched the initiative Green Bangalore 1:1 as part of his larger initiative Sasyagraha, to achieve 1 tree per human ratio, from the current 7 humans per tree as against the ideal 7 trees per human per research by IISc. EcoChetana initiative was to promote GreenLifeStyle in the state of Karnataka.

As part of Sansad Adarsh Gram Yojana (SAGY) Ananth Kumar had adopted the Ragihalli village.

He introduced Arogya Chetana Mediclaim group insurance facility for schoolchildren inaugurated by Dr APJ Abdul Kalam.

== Death ==
On 12 November 2018 he died due to pancreatic cancer and complications. He was survived by his wife, Tejaswini, and his two daughters, Aishwarya and Vijeta.

Lok Sabha
Preceded by K. V. Gowda	Succeeded by Tejasvi Surya	
Political offices
Preceded by C. M. Ibrahim	Minister of Civil Aviation; 19 March 1998 – 13 October 1999	Succeeded by Sharad Yadav
Preceded by Madan Lal Khurana	Minister of Tourism; 30 January 1999 – 13 October 1999	Succeeded by Uma Bharti
Preceded by Uma Bharti	Minister of Tourism; 2 February 2000 – 1 September 2001	Succeeded by Jagmohan
Preceded by Srikant Kumar Jena; Minister of State (Independent Charge)	Minister of Chemicals and Fertilizers; 26 May 2014 – 12 November 2018	Succeeded by D. V. Sadananda Gowda
Preceded by Venkaiah Naidu	Minister of Parliamentary Affairs; 5 July 2016 – 12 November 2018	Succeeded by Narendra Singh Tomar
