= Ronita Bardhan =

Indian-British architectural engineer, data scientist, professor, and researcher

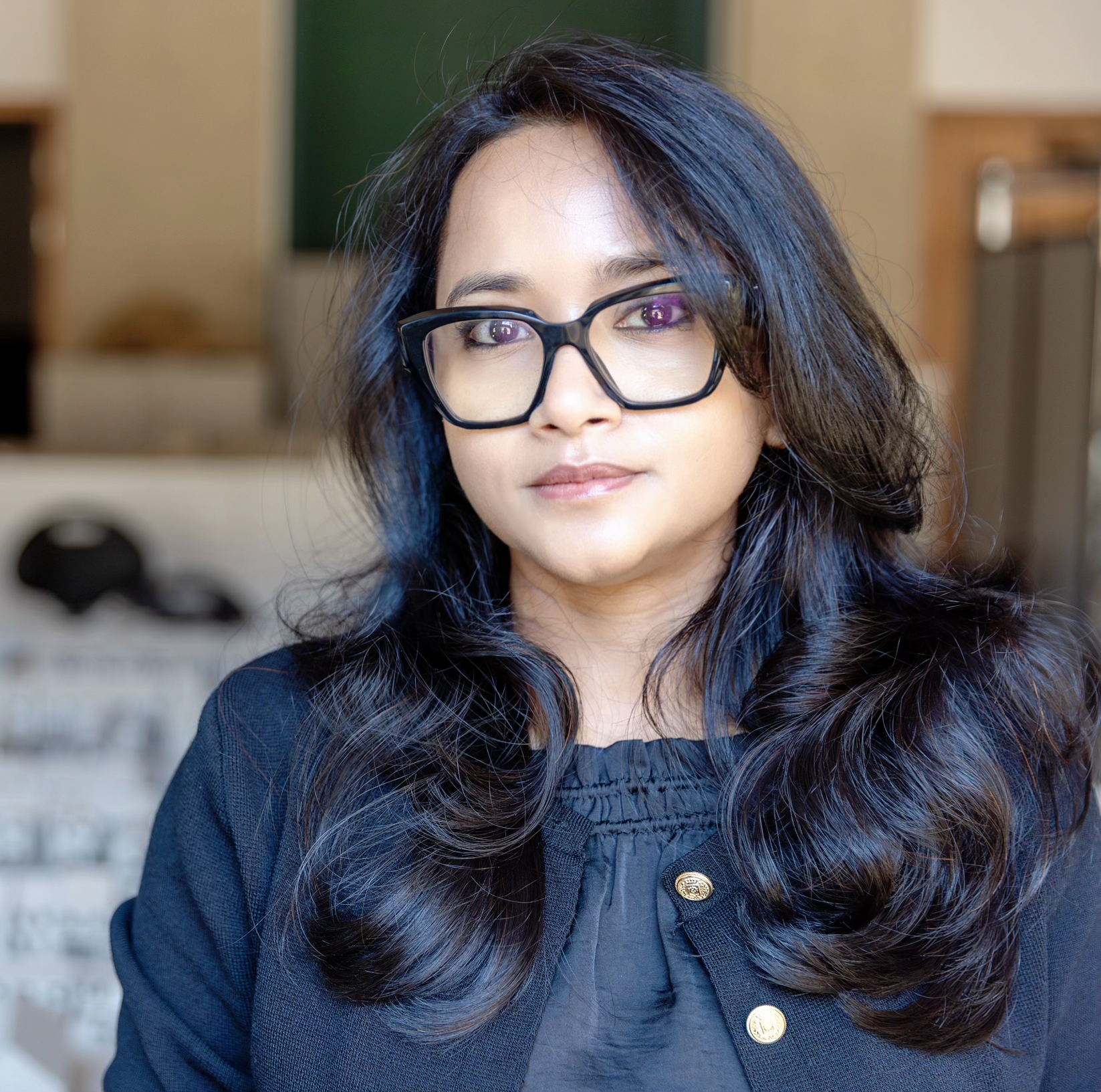
- Born: Kolkata, India
- Education: Indian Institute of Engineering Science and Technology (BArch); Indian Institute of Technology Kharagpur (MCP); University of Cambridge (MA); University of Tokyo (PhD)
- Employer(s): University of Cambridge; Stanford University; IIT Bombay

Professor at the University of Cambridge

Ronita Bardhan, is an Indian-British architectural engineer, data scientist, professor, and researcher. She holds the position of Professor of Sustainable Built Environment and Health at the Department of Architecture and Co-Director of Cambridge Zero (the University’s flagship climate initiative) at the University of Cambridge in the United Kingdom. Bardhan leads the Cambridge Sustainable Design Group and is a Fellow in Architecture at Selwyn College, Cambridge. Additionally, she serves as an honorary Professor at the London School of Hygiene and Tropical Medicine and is involved with the Pathfinder Initiative and the Climate and Health Group, which focus on research related to climate change and health.

== Education and career ==
Ronita Bardhan was born and raised in Kolkata, India. She earned a Bachelor of Architecture from the Indian Institute of Engineering Science and Technology, where she ranked first in her program for all five years of study. Bardhan received a Master's degree in City Planning from the Indian Institute of Technology Kharagpur, where she was awarded the Prof. V.N. Prasad National Best Thesis Award for her research in urban and regional planning. She obtained her PhD in Urban Engineering from the University of Tokyo, Japan, as a Monbukagakushō Scholar. Her doctoral thesis focused on quality of life in rapidly urbanizing, high-density urban environments.

After completing her PhD, Bardhan joined the Indian Institute of Technology Bombay as an Assistant Professor and was a founding faculty member of the Centre for Urban Science and Engineering, where she established the Sustainable Design Group. In 2016, she became a visiting Assistant Professor in the Civil and Environmental Engineering Department at Stanford University in the United States. She was subsequently appointed as the Shimizu Visiting Professor at Stanford University.

Bardhan was recognized as an EPSRC Women in Engineering Ambassador in 2023 and was a finalist for the Top 50 Women in Engineering in the United Kingdom in 2024. She was also listed among the top 30 professors in sustainable Architecture for her contributions to climate-responsive and health-drive design.

== Research and work ==
Bardhan's research focuses on the intersection of architectural engineering, data science, and public health, examining the built environment as an important factor in precision population health.

Bardhan's research focuses on understanding the connections between sustainable built environment design principles and health and disease outcomes in the context of climate change. She has conducted extensive studies on slum rehabilitation housing in the Global South, exploring how the design of social housing can contribute to increasing heat stress and disease risks, such as tuberculosis and malaria. Her work also examines the gendered dimensions of design and how modifications can alleviate health outcomes by reducing exposure to heat and air pollution. Bardhan's research project, RAHAT, investigates women-led responsive actions for heat adaptation and is part of the Global Heat Health Information Network. In 2025, her team assessed how urban design affects the cooling potential of trees, noting that inefficient placement of trees can lead to increased urban temperatures.

Bardhan has presented at various organizations, including the World Economic Forum, the Asian Development Bank, the Royal Institute of British Architects (RIBA), and the International Energy Agency (IEA). Her research has contributed to policy discussions at the UK Parliament and has been referenced in numerous policy documents worldwide. She is a member of the editorial board of several academic journals published by Elsevier, Springer Nature, and IOP Publishing.

== Awards ==
• Finalist for the Top 50 Women in Engineering

• Ronita Bardhan awarded the Exceptional Woman of Excellence Award.

• Ronita Bardhan was the Charles Wallace India Trust Fellow.

• Building Energy Efficiency Higher & Advanced Network (BHAVAN) Fellowship.
