= Chaitanyamoy Ganguly =

Indian nuclear scientist

- Born: 31 December 1946 (age 78); Shibpore, West Bengal, India
- Occupation: Nuclear scientist
- Awards: Padma Shri; VASVIK Industrial Research Award; Indian Nuclear Society Award; IIM Kamani Gold Medal; IIM Binani Gold Medal; MRSI Medal; D. N. Agarwal Award; Malaviya Award; KCP Award; National Metallurgists Day Award

Chaitanyamoy Ganguly is an Indian nuclear scientist and a former head of the Nuclear Fuel Cycle and Materials Section of the International Atomic Energy Agency (IAEA), credited with many innovations in the field of nuclear material science. He was honored by the government of India in 2002, with the fourth-highest Indian civilian award of Padma Shri.

== Biography ==
Ganguly was born on 31 December 1946 at Shibpur in the Indian state of West Bengal. He graduated in metallurgical engineering (BE) in 1968 from Indian Institute of Engineering Science and Technology, Shibpur) of the University of Calcutta and had higher training at the Bhabha Atomic Research Centre, (BARC) Trombay. His career started with BARC at their Radiometallurgy Division in 1969 where he worked till 1995, in professional positions and as a faculty member at the BARC training school. During this period, he was also deputed to Karlsruhe Research Centre (KFK), present day Karlsruhe Institute of Technology, Germany, on a fellowship from the International Atomic Energy Agency, for advanced research under D. Vollath and Klaus Kümmerer on X-ray scattering technology. On his return, he obtained a doctoral degree (PhD) from the University of Calcutta in 1980 and had postdoctoral research at Nuclear Research Centre, Juelich, Germany as a Humboldt Fellow. Ganguly, after returning from Germany, was made the head of the radiometallurgy division of BARC in 1986, a post he held till his move to the Central Glass and Ceramic Research Institute (CGCRI), Kolkata in 1995.

In 1998, Ganguly was made the chairman and chief executive of the Nuclear Fuel Complex of the Department of Atomic Energy and he stayed at the post till 2004. The International Atomic Energy Agency appointed him, in 2004, as the head of the Nuclear Fuel Cycle and Materials Section. On his retirement from IAEA in 2009, when Cameco Corporation, Canada, reportedly world's largest publicly traded uranium company and the third largest producer of uranium, opened its India subsidiary at Hyderabad, he was appointed as the president. After over three years at Cameco, Ganguly moved to the Indian Institute of Technology, Kanpur, as the distinguished visiting professor and continues to serve the institution in that capacity.

Ganguly is a former president and life member of the Indian Ceramic Society and a former president of the Powder Metallurgy Association of India. He has served, as a member, many professional organizations such as the Indian Institute of Metals, Indian Institute of Ceramics (IICERAM), Indian Nuclear Society, Institution of Engineers (India), Materials Research Society of India and the Indian Society for Non Destructive Testing (ISNT). He has also served as the editor of the Journal of Nuclear Materials, a peer reviewed journal for materials research in nuclear science.

== Legacy ==
Ganguly is credited with the establishment of the plutonium fuel laboratory at the Radiometallurgy Division of the Bhabha Atomic Research Centre. His contributions are reported in the development of ceramic and metallic fuels based on uranium, plutonium and thorium, to be used in the research and power reactors of the organization. His research is known to have led to the development of plutonium rich mixed uranium plutonium monocarbide fuel, a world first, for use with the fast breeder test reactor (FBTR) at the Indira Gandhi Centre for Atomic Research (IGCAR), Kalpakkam, making India the first country to use the fuel in a fast reactor. The development of stainless steel clad plutonium oxide fuel for Purnima Research Reactor at BARC and aluminum clad, aluminum-uranium 233 fuel for Kamini Research Reactor at IGCAR are two other contributions attributed to Ganguly. He is also credited with the development of other plutonium alloys such as plutonium-gallium (Pu-Ga), plutonium-aluminum (Al-Pu) and plutonium-beryllium (PuBe) at R and D levels.

During his tenure at the Central Glass and Ceramic Research Institute, Ganguly is reported to have developed a high density lead glass for shielding windows from radiation. He has also contributed to the development of:

- variants of laser glass and zero expansion glass which are in use in defence and aerospace industries,
- thorium based mixed oxide fuels for water cooled reactors,
- remotely operable sol-gel microsphere pelletisation (SGMP) process used in oxide fabrication, and
- carbide and nitride fuel pellets.

His research findings have been recorded in over 200 scientific papers, published at various peer reviewed journals and he holds four patents. He is the editor of two books, Nuclear Fuel Fabrication and Advanced Ceramics, both published by Trans Tech Publication, Switzerland. He is known to have mentored many students for their masters and doctoral researches at the Indian Institute of Technology, Mumbai, Indian Institute of Science, Bengaluru, and Osmania University and is an accredited guide of MTech and PhD at the University of Mumbai. He has also participated in the IAEA technical cooperation program for transfer of technology to the developing countries.

== Awards and recognitions ==
Chaitanyamoy Ganguly, a Distinguished Scientist of the Central Glass and Ceramic Research Institute, is an elected Fellow of the Indian Academy of Sciences (FASc), the National Academy of Sciences, India (FNASc), Indian National Academy of Engineering (FNAE) and the Institution of Engineers (India) (FIE). He is also a Fellow of the Indian Institute of Metals, Indian Institute of Ceramics and Alexander von Humboldt Foundation, Germany. He has received the VASVIK Industrial Research Award, Indian Nuclear Society Award, IIM Kamani Gold Medal and IIM Binani Gold Medal. He is also a recipient of the MRSI Medal, D. N. Agarwal Award, Malaviya Award of the Indian Ceramic Society and KCP Award of the Indian Institute of Welding. He has received the National Metallurgists Day Award of the Ministry of Steel and Mines and the Government of India followed it up with the civilian honour of Padma Shri in 2002.

== See also ==
- International Atomic Energy Agency
- Bhabha Atomic Research Centre
- Central Glass and Ceramic Research Institute
- Indira Gandhi Centre for Atomic Research
- Cameco Corporation, Canada
- Department of Atomic Energy
