= Awake: The Life of Yogananda =

- Film poster
- Directed by: Paola di Florio; Lisa Leeman
- Produced by: CounterPoint Films - Peter Rader
- Music by: Vivek Maddala, Michael Mollura
- Release date: October 10, 2014
- Running time: 87 minutes
- Country: United States
- Language: English

Awake: The Life of Yogananda is a 2014 documentary about the Indian yogi and guru Paramahansa Yogananda who came to the West in the 1920s to teach yoga and meditation. The film is in English with subtitles in seventeen languages. The film, directed by Paola di Florio and Lisa Leeman who are independent American filmmakers, was commissioned by Yogananda's Self-Realization Fellowship.

== Content ==
It includes interviews with disciples of Paramahansa Yogananda, as well as with Ravi Shankar, George Harrison, Krishna Das, and others. It was filmed over three years with the participation of thirty countries, including on pilgrimages in India, at Harvard Divinity School and its physics labs, the Center for Science and Spirituality at the University of Pennsylvania, and the Chopra Center in Carlsbad, California. The film was released thetrically through GATHR's Theatrical On Demand distribution platform, grossing more than $1.4 million at the box office.

== Awards ==
- Winner of the Audience Award for Best Film at the Illuminate Film Festival
- Winner Maui Film Festival, Spirit in Cinema Award
- Winner Conscious Life Award, Conscious Life Expo Film Festival
- Official Selection Seattle International Film Festival
- Official Selection Tel Aviv Spirit Film Festival
- Herat International Women's Film Festival, Afghanistan

== See also ==
- Autobiography of a Yogi, 1946 book
- Arise, awake, and stop not till the goal is reached, Vivekananda
