= Michel Danino =

French-Indian Hindutva author

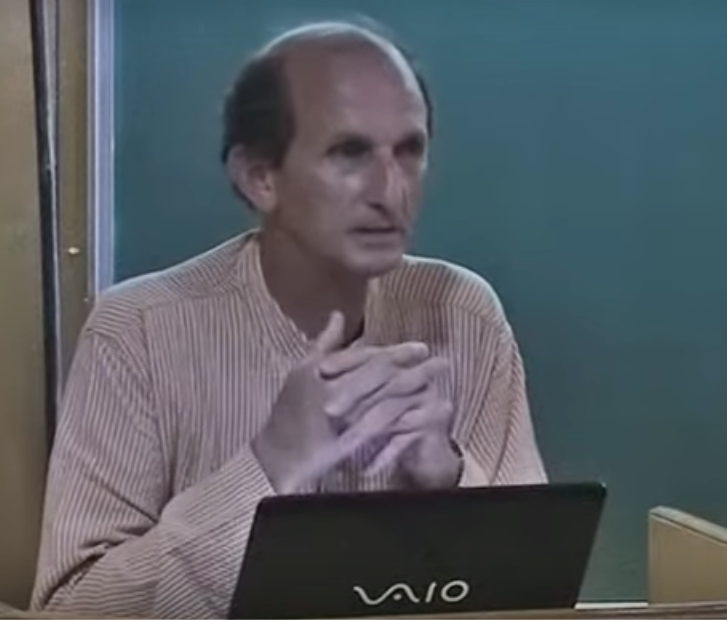
- Danino in 2016
- Born: 1956; Honfleur, France
- Occupation: Author
- Honours: Padma Shri (2017)

Michel Danino (born 1956) is a French-born author and teacher, whose works have been criticised for historical negationism. He has served as the chairperson of the National Council of Educational Research and Training's social science curriculum and was awarded the Padma Shri in 2017 for contributions to literature and education. His views on early Indian history have been criticised for aligning with Hindutva and engaging in ideological pseudohistory.

== Biography ==
Michel Danino was born in Honfleur, In 1977, at the age of twenty-one, he travelled to India and later joined the international township of Auroville in Tamil Nadu. Danino lived in Auroville until 1982, after which he moved to the Nilgiri Mountains of southern India, where he resided for nearly two decades. In 2003, he settled near Coimbatore. In interviews, Danino has stated that he later obtained Indian citizenship.

He has served on several academic and governmental bodies related to education and historical research. Danino was a member of the Indian Council of Historical Research (ICHR) between 2015 and 2018. He served as the chairperson of the National Council of Educational Research and Training (NCERT) curriculum committee for social science and was a visiting professor in the Department of Humanities and Social Sciences at IIT Gandhinagar.

== Views ==
Danino's works and views are influenced by Sri Aurobindo, who speculated against the Indo-Aryan migrations. Danino translated Mother's Agenda, the 13 volume biography of Mirra Alfassa, from French to English. Sri Aurobindo and India's Rebirth (2018) describes Danino's views on the development of Aurobindo's thought.

=== Indigenous Aryanism ===
In The Invasion that Never was, published by Danino in 1996, he argued against the academically accepted view that the Indo-Aryans originated in Central Asia, before migrating to India. He has argued that "No ancient or medieval Indian text would support the Aryan invasion theory" and that "It is genetically proven that Aryans and Dravidians belong to the same race".

=== Saraswati River ===
Danino wrote The Lost River: On The Trail of the Sarasvatī in 2010, arguing against longstanding scholarly consensus. In the book, Danino sought to connect the Hindu mythological Saraswati River, first mentioned in the Rigveda, an ancient Hindu text, with the current Ghaggar-Hakra River. Danino has defended the inclusion of names such as "Sindhu-Saraswati" and "Indus-Saraswati", as alternatives for the Indus Valley Civilisation, in NCERT Textbooks. He has argued that the drying of the Saraswati River was the cause of Indus Valley Civilisation's collapse.

== Reception ==
=== Scholarly criticism ===
A proponent of Hindutva, he has been criticised for his sectarian scholarship and historical negationism.

Historian Peter Heehs' opinion of one of Danino's works, Sri Aurobindo and Indian Civilization, is that it was lacking in linguistic knowledge, and made up of attacks on colonial orientalists and half-informed invocations of nationalist orientalists. Heehs also criticised Danino's other works for appropriating Sri Aurobindo in his campaign against the Indo-Aryan migrations, and for distorting Aurobindo's speculative views as assertions. Heehs added that Danino selectively cherry-picked quotes from his draft-manuscripts and ignored his published works, which were far more nuanced.

=== NCERT social science curriculum changes and controversy ===
As head of NCERT’s social science committee, Danino has overseen the presentation of a gentle and sanitised version of Indian history. For instance, under his leadership, the Class 8 social science textbooks portray the Maratha Empire in a favourable light, while depicting the Mughal Empire highly negatively. Critics have characterised the changes as an ideological move. In an interview with ThePrint, Danino denied any ideological bias. In the same interview, he said, "We avoid all unpleasantness, thinking perhaps that this is going to, you know, traumatise the student and so on."

=== 2026 NCERT judiciary chapter controversy ===
In March 2026, the Supreme Court of India directed the central government, state governments, and publicly funded institutions to disassociate from Danino and two other academics, Suparna Diwakar and Alok Prasanna Kumar, following controversy over a chapter titled “Corruption in the Judiciary” in a Class 8 NCERT social science textbook.

The Supreme Court took suo motu cognisance of the textbook chapter, which discussed corruption within the judiciary, and ordered that the three academics be barred from participating in the preparation of school curricula or textbooks for institutions receiving public funds.

Following the court’s order, NCERT reconstituted its National Syllabus and Teaching Learning Material Committee (NSTC), removing Danino and other members associated with the controversial chapter. According to the Indian Express,

The court slammed the chapter on the judiciary as a “calculated move to undermine and demean the dignity of the judiciary”, and imposed a “complete blanket ban” on further publication, reprinting or digital dissemination of the textbook.

Danino and the other academics later approached the Supreme Court seeking a review of the order, arguing that the chapter had been written through a collaborative process and did not intend to malign the judiciary.

MP Priyanka Chaturvedi criticised the ban, and added that the judiciary should "be open to scrutiny".

== Selected works ==
=== Books ===
- Danino, Michel (1996). The Invasion That Never Was. New Delhi: Voice of India. ISBN 978-8185137223.
- Danino, Michel (1999). Sri Aurobindo and Indian Civilization. New Delhi: Rupa Publications. ISBN 978-8187373049.
- Danino, Michel (2000). The Indian Mind Then and Now. Auroville: Auroville Press. ISBN 978-8187373179.
- Danino, Michel (2000). Is Indian Culture Obsolete?. New Delhi: Voice of India. ISBN 978-8185137612.
- Danino, Michel (2001). Kali Yuga or the Age of Confusion. New Delhi: Voice of India. ISBN 978-8185137711.
- Danino, Michel (2010). The Lost River: On the Trail of the Sarasvati. New Delhi: Penguin Books India. ISBN 978-0143068648.

=== Research articles ===
- Danino, Michel (2016). "Aryans and the Indus Civilization: Archaeological, Skeletal, and Molecular Evidence". A Companion to South Asia in the Past. Wiley Blackwell. pp. 205–224. doi:10.1002/9781119055280.ch13.
- Danino, Michel (2019). "Methodological Issues in the Indo-European Debate". Journal of Biosciences. 44 (3). doi:10.1007/s12038-019-9876-4.

=== Articles and essays ===
- Danino, Michel (28 May 2018). "The Metrology behind Harappan Town-Planning – I". IndiaFacts.
- Danino, Michel (30 May 2018). "The Metrology behind Harappan Town-Planning – II". IndiaFacts.

== Honours ==
=== Padma Shri ===
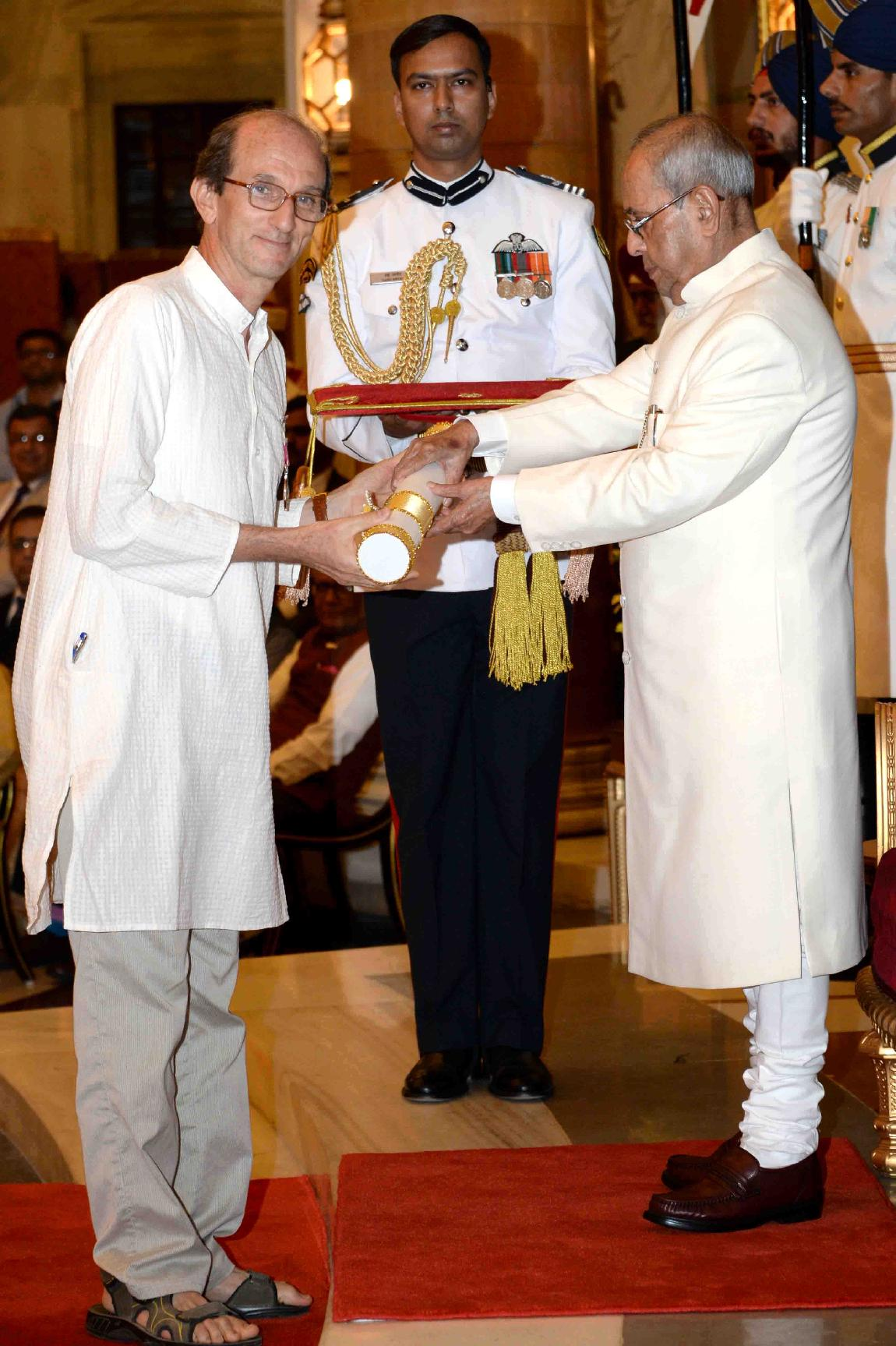
Michel Danino receiving the Padma Shri from President Pranab Mukherjee at the Civil Investiture Ceremony at Rashtrapati Bhavan in 2017.

In 2017, Danino was awarded the Padma Shri, India's fourth-highest civilian award, for his contributions to literature and education.

== See also ==
- Hindutva pseudohistory
- Indigenous Aryanists
