= Vidhi Centre for Legal Policy =

New Delhi-based Indian legal think-tank

- Formation: 2013
- Type: Think tank, Nonprofit, Legal research
- Headquarters: A-232, Defence Colony, New Delhi, India 110024
- Research Director: Arghya Sengupta
- Website: vidhilegalpolicy.in

Vidhi Centre for Legal Policy is a legal think-tank and policy research organisation with offices in New Delhi, Karnataka, Maharashtra, West Bengal and Tamil Nadu. Vidhi conducts research, assists in drafting legislation and policy reports, and provides advisory support to governments, regulators and other stakeholders on law and governance, with work in areas such as constitutional law, data protection, health, technology regulation, and criminal justice reform.

== History ==
Vidhi was founded in 2013 by Arghya Sengupta, Alok Prasanna Kumar, Debanshu Mukherjee, and Dhvani Mehta. The organisation is registered in India as a not-for-profit entity and maintains an internal board of directors and a team of researchers led by its founding research director, Sengupta.

Sengupta began his career in 2010 by advising the government on the Nuclear Liability Bill.

== Work ==
Vidhi’s work comprises independent research reports, legislative and regulatory drafting assistance, impact assessments, and public engagement (seminars, workshops and briefs). It publishes research on topics including digital regulation and data protection, Aadhaar and identity systems, public health law (including analysis related to the Aarogya Setu contact-tracing app), criminal justice reform, and welfare/state capacity topics. Vidhi’s outputs include policy briefs, longer reports, explainers and model laws intended to be practical inputs for legislators and policymakers.

Vidhi has been cited as an adviser to or participant in several government consultations and expert committees, and its researchers have served on governmental and quasi-governmental panels addressing data protection and technology policy. Vidhi also partners with philanthropic foundations and educational institutions for research and capacity building. Media profiles and business registries note Vidhi’s increasing role in national policy debates since its founding.

== Controversies and criticisms ==
Vidhi’s involvement in government technology projects and data-policy work has attracted public scrutiny and criticism from journalists and commentators. Reporting in outlets such as The Caravan has questioned potential conflicts of interest where a policy research body both advises governments and undertakes paid consultancy work for agencies affected by the policies it helps design. Vidhi’s role in the development and explanation of the Aarogya Setu data-access protocol during the COVID-19 pandemic has been specifically reported and debated in the press. Vidhi and its leadership have responded in public forums describing their work and the intent of their contributions.
