= Arise, awake, and stop not till the goal is reached =

Slogan of Swami Vivekananda

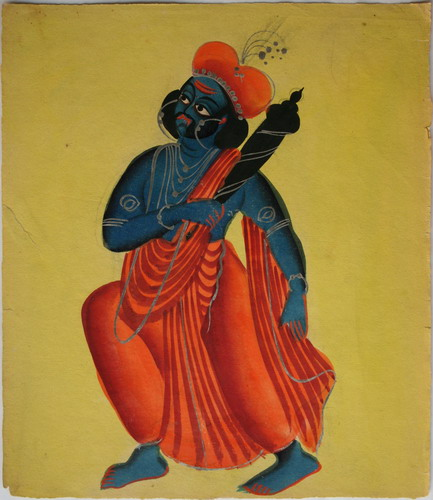
- In the 1.3.14 chapter of Katha Upanishad, the first words of this phrase can be found, where Yama (pictured) is teaching Nachiketa the methods of Yoga.
- Character: Yama
- First used in: Lectures of Swami Vivekananda.

"Arise, awake and stop not till the goal is reached" is a slogan popularized in the late 19th century by Indian Hindu monk and philosopher Swami Vivekananda, who took inspiration in a sloka of Katha Upanishad. It was his message to the world to get out of their hypnotized state of mind and discover their true nature. This shloka is the basis of the title of the 1944 book The Razor's Edge and its 1946 film adaptation, its 1984 film adaptation, and of various music albums in the west by bands like AC/DC, Dave Holland, etc.

== In Katha Upanishad ==
Nachiketa, the child protagonist of Katha Upanishad, was sent to Yama, the Hindu god of death, by his father Vajashrava. In the abode of Yama, he answered Nachiketa's questions and taught him Self-knowledge and the methods of Yoga. The words "Arise, awake..." can be found in the 1.3.14 chapter of the book, where Yama is advising Nachiketa—

Sanskrit (Devanagari)
Transliteration
English translation

उत्तिष्ठत जाग्रत प्राप्य वरान्निबोधत,
क्षुरासन्न धारा निशिता दुरत्यद्दुर्गम पथ: तत् कवयो वदन्ति |

Uttisthata Jagrata Prapya Varannibodhata
Kshurasanna Dhara Nishita Durataya durgama Pathah tat kavayo Vadanti

Arise! Awake! Approach the great and learn.
Like the sharp edge of a razor is that path,
so the wise say—hard to tread and difficult to cross.

== In Swami Vivekananda's teachings ==
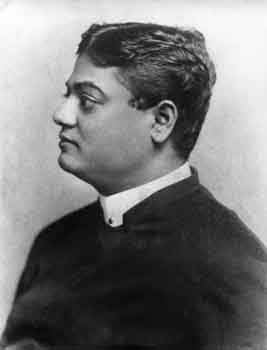
Swami Vivekananda widely used this quote in his teachings.

The inspirational sloka was Swami Vivekananda's message to the Indians to get out of their hypnotized state of mind. The sloka was meant as a call to his countrymen to awaken their "sleeping soul" and propagate the message of peace and blessings given by the "ancient Mother" to the world. "Awake" also denotes the awakening of one's real nature and the consequent ushering in of prosperity.

On 24 April 1897 Vivekananda wrote a letter to Sarala Ghoshal. In that letter, he stressed giving the public only positive education, because of his belief that negative thoughts weaken men. In that letter, he also reiterated this sloka.

Vivekananda quoted this sloka in several lectures and discourses. In a lecture delivered on 12 November 1896 at Lahore, he said:

Therefore, young men of Lahore, raise once more that mighty banner of Advaita, for on no other ground can you have that wonderful love until you see that the same Lord is present everywhere. Unfurl that banner of love! "Arise, awake, and stop not till the goal is reached." Arise, arise once more, for nothing can be done without renunciation.

In her essay Reminiscences of Swami Vivekananda, Sister Christine wrote that Vivekananda wanted to see men striving to find the Supreme. She wrote:

All else might be false, this alone was true. He realized it. After his own great realization, life held but one purpose—to give the message with which he was entrusted, to point out the path and to help others on the road to the same supreme goal. "Arise, awake, and stop not till the goal is reached."

"Arise" was meant as a passionate call for national awakening to obtain political freedom for the country from colonialism, and not to "stop" until the "goal" was achieved. This was essential in the social, economic and political fields. "Arise" was also intended to mean to get out of the state of helplessness. His emphasis was on freedom to the nation, as in the US on 4 July 1776. Swamiji also urged people to learn from Hindu sacred scriptures, which he felt contained all the instructions to arise out of the "hypnotism of weakness" and which indicated that no individual is inherently weak.

== Influence ==
The 1998 film Swami Vivekananda, directed by G. V. Iyer, ends with this quote where Mammootty gives a brief speech on Vivekananda and his ideals and concludes the speech with this quote. On 12 January 2013, on the 150 birth anniversary, then Gujarat Chief Minister Narendra Modi and now prime minister of India, wrote a blog post on his personal website to pay tribute to Vivekananda. He named the post "Commemorating Swami Vivekananda: Arise, Awake and stop not till the goal is reached". The sloka is inscribed on the main stage of an auditorium of Ramakrishna Mission Institute of Culture, Kolkata, a branch of Ramakrishna Math and Ramakrishna Mission. Dr. Sanjeev Kumar, an Indian author, called this a "life-transforming line" and wrote a book named Stop Not Till the Goal is Reached in 2010.

== Usage ==
=== Higher education ===
The phrase is used as the motto of many universities, colleges like IIEST, Shibpur, IIT (ISM) Dhanbad.

== See also ==
- Awake: The Life of Yogananda, (2014 film)
