= Tejaswini Ananth Kumar =

Indian politician and social worker (born 1966)

Tejaswini AnanthKumar
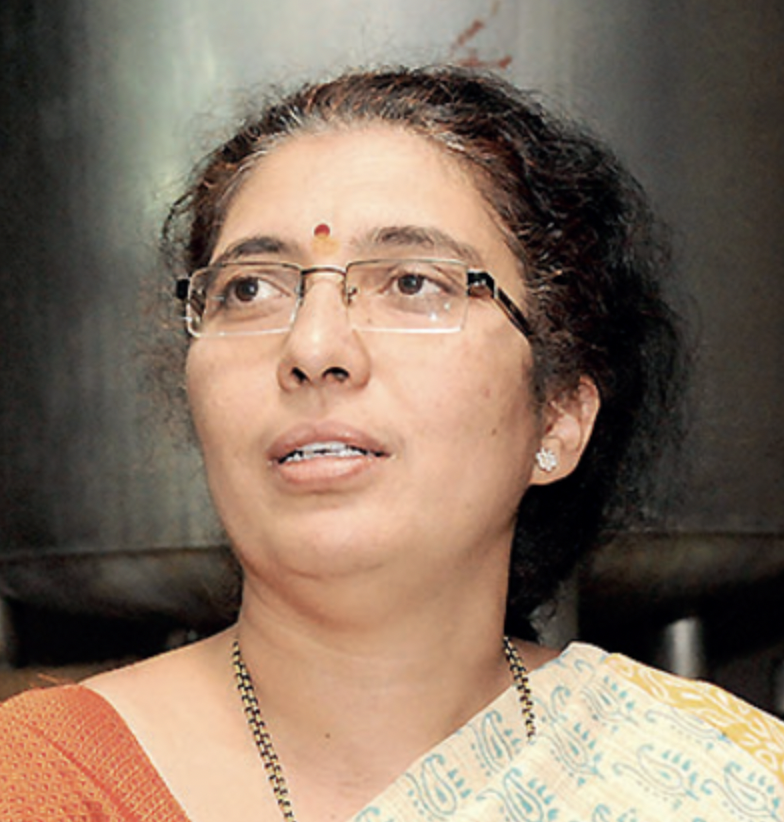

Chairperson of IIEST Shibpur Chairperson of NIT Kurukshetra
- Incumbent
- Assumed office September 2023

Personal details
- Born: Tejaswini Oak; 11 March 1966 (age 60) India
- Spouse: Ananth Kumar (m. 1989; died 2018)
- Education: B.E, PG in Indology
- Alma mater: B.V.B. College of Engineering and Technology, Bangalore University
- Occupation: Social Activist, Chairperson of Board of Governors at IIEST, Shibapur and NIT Kurukshetra and Member of Board of Governors IIT Roorkee
- Known for: Adamya Chethana Foundation, Charity

Tejaswini Ananth Kumar (born Tejaswini Oak; 11 March 1966) is an Indian social worker and an educationist.

Kumar is the Chairman and co-founder of Adamya Chetana Foundation.

In September 2023 she was appointed as chairperson of the board of governors of IIEST, Shibpur for a period of next three years.

== Early life ==
She was very active at all levels of Akhil Bharatiya Vidyarthi Parishad (ABVP) organizing various student activities. She served as State Joint Secretary & National executive member of ABVP.

Between 1988 and 1993, she worked as a Software Engineer in Bengaluru, Lecturer at BMS college of Engineering and Lecturer at SDM college of Engineering.

She worked as a scientist at ADA (then headed by Dr APJ Abdul Kalam) between 1993 – 1997 and on the LCA – Tejas project.

== Social work ==
She along with her husband, Ananth Kumar, founded Adamya Chethana Foundation, a nonprofit organisation for social service. It was set up in 1998 in memory of Girija Shastry, mother of Ananth Kumar. It supports underprivileged children with food in schools through the mid-day meals programme. About 160,000 meals are served daily.

Since 2006, Tejaswini is a Founder Trustee of Sri Shankara Cancer Foundation, 600 bedded state of art charitable hospital, a not for profit organisation with its core focus on cure and prevention of Cancer. The Rani Chennamma University Belgaum presented her with an honorary doctorate for her social service.

Dr. Tejaswini Ananth Kumar took up the responsibility of serving lunch and dinner during the pandemic to thousands of health care workers, covid warriors, and migrant laborers across Bengaluru.

The Adamya Chetana foundation headed by Dr. Tejaswini Ananth Kumar received the Rajyostava award for the mid-day meal program in 2021.

She started implementing SAGY (Sansad Adarsh Grama Yojana) at Ragihalli, the village adopted by Ananth Kumar. The Adamya Chetana foundation has taken up developmental works in the village.

Dr. Tejaswini Ananth Kumar wanted to transform the Adamya Chetana's kitchen into a zero garbage unit. She started the initiative and brought down the kitchen dump to zero where nothing is wasted or thrown into the dustbin. Dr. Tejaswini Ananth Kumar oversees and takes care of the whole kitchen operations.

Food packets and food kits were distributed to senior citizens and the needy during lockdown by Adamya Chetana under her guidance with the help of volunteers.

Green Sunday program led by Dr. Tejaswini Ananth Kumar plants trees every week with volunteers as an initiative for a greener Bengaluru. The project aims to plant one tree per person. The event is organized on Sundays and started in 2015.

Dr. Tejaswini Ananth Kumar set up a Plate bank initiative that helps in reducing plastic usage. The Adamya Chetana foundation has a stock of plates, spoons, and glasses that can be borrowed during events and returned at no cost.
