= Renuka Dasgupta =

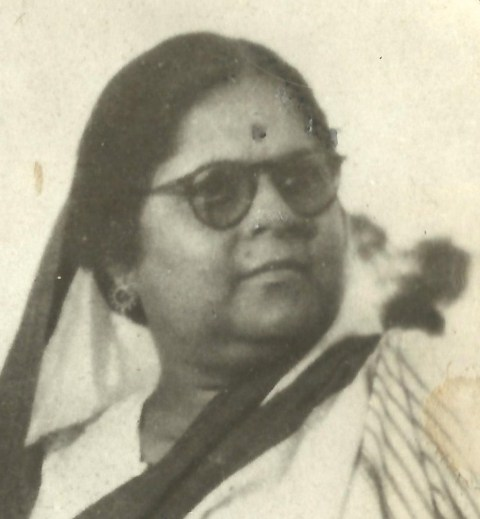
- Dasgupta in 1949

Background information
- Born: 22 August 1910; Konnagar, Bengal Presidency, British India
- Died: 1 January 1991 (aged 80) Kolkata, West Bengal, India
- Genres: Atulprasadi, Thumri, Nazrulgeeti, Rabindra Sangeet, Bhajan
- Occupation: Singer
- Years active: 1925–1972
- Labels: Hindustan Records (INRECO), His Master's Voice

Renuka Dasgupta (née Sengupta; 22 August 1910 – 1 January 1991) was a Bengali singer, best known for the songs of Atulprasad Sen. She was a direct disciple of Atulprasad Sen, Kazi Nazrul Islam and Dilipkumar Roy.

== Early life ==
Born in Konnagar, West Bengal, Dasgupta lived in Gaya, Dhaka and Calcutta. She was a cousin of Sahana Devi, Atulprasad Sen, Kanak Biswas (née Das). Dasgupta taught music in Kamrunnesa Girls High School at Tikatuli, Dhaka in the late 1920s. She married Hirendra Chandra Dasgupta, a graduate engineer of Bengal Engineering College in the early 1930s and settled permanently in Calcutta. She was associated with the radio audition committee of All India Radio (AIR) in Calcutta.

== Early work ==
With cousin Kanak Biswas, 1985

In 1932, three Indian recording companies were formed in Calcutta out of a nationalistic urge to compete with the British-owned Gramophone Company of India. One of these was Hindusthan Records. The owner C.C. Saha requested Rabindranath Tagore to record some songs and recitations. From those recordings were published the first record, H1. Atulprasad Sen recorded two songs which were published in the second record, H2. The third record, H3, had the songs "Jodi gokulachandra braje na elo" (kirtan) and "Pagla montare tui bandh" (Atulprasad) sung by Renuka Sengupta. Sales of this record reached an unprecedented high.

Dasgupta was also trained by Kazi Nazrul Islam and recorded two songs under his tutelage, Krishna Chandra Dey. The recorded song was "Aye Bhikharin Premnagar Ke Pritam Pritam Bole". In 1935 she was trained by Sailajaranjan Majumdar to sing Rabindra Sangeet songs chosen for her by Rabindranath Tagore. She went on to record five Rabindra Sangeets in her career.

=== Recorded Rabindra Sangeets ===
1. "Diner Pore Din Je Gelo" (1935)
2. "Aamaar Ki Bedonaa" (1935)
3. "Basante Basante Tomar Kobi Re Dao Dak"
4. "Koto Katha Tare Chilo Bolite"
5. "Tomaro Shurer Dhara"

=== Recorded Nazrul Geeti ===
1. "Kon rosh jomuner kule"
2. "Shukshari tonumon momo"

=== Recorded songs of Atul Prasad ===
1. "Pagla Monta Re Tui Bandh" (1932)
2. "Emono Badole Tumi Kotha"
3. "Nid Nahi Akhi Pate"
4. "Esho Dujaney Kheli"
5. "Ohe Jagatkaron" (1969–70)
6. "Chaa(n)dni Raatey"
7. "Amaar Chokh Be(n)dhey Bhober Khelay"
8. "Jodi Tor Hrid Jamunaa"
9. "Ke Go Gaahiley"
10. "Ogo Saathi Momo Saathi"
11. "Shuktara Tomar Chholo Chholo Akhi"
12. "Amar paran kotha jay"
13. "Se dake amare" (1969–70)
14. "Ki ar chahibo balo" (1969–70)
15. "Tobo ontoro eto monthoro"
16. "Srabone ghono ghota"
17. "Aaj Amar Shunya Ghore"
18. "Krondeshi potho charini"

=== Recorded songs in other genres (list incomplete) ===
1. "Jodi Gokulochandra Braje Na Elo" (kirtan)
2. "Aye Bhikarin Prem Nagar Ki"
3. "Ki Roop Dekhinu Kaalaa" – Jnanadas (kirtan)
4. "Dine dine din je chole jay" (bhatiyali)
5. "Nandanandana chande chandana" (kirtan)
6. "Madhaba tunhu rahali re madhupur" (kirtan)
7. "Khomiyo he he shib"
