= Council of NITSER =

Indian governing body within education

Council of National Institutes of Technology, Science Education and Research
- Chairman: Minister of Education
- Parent organization: Ministry of Education
- Website: nitcouncil.org.in

The Council of National Institutes of Technology, Science Education and Research (NITSER) commonly known as the Council of NITs or NIT Council, is the supreme governing body of India's National Institutes of Technology (NITs), Indian Institute of Engineering Science and Technology (IIESTS) and Indian Institutes of Science Education and Research (IISERs) as per provisions under Section 30 of the National Institutes of Technology, Science Education and Research Act, 2007 (NITSER Act 2007). The Council of NITSER consists of chairman, directors of all NITs, IIEST and IISERs along with the government nominees from various sectors with the Minister of Education as the Chairman of the Council. The Council of NITSER is the highest decision making body in the NIT, IIEST and IISER fraternities and is answerable only to the Government of India. The Council of NITSER is expected to meet regularly and take steps conducive for maximum growth of the NITs, IIEST and IISERs as whole in the near future.

== Composition ==
The Council of NITSER is created under the NITSER Act 2007 and its present composition stands as follows:

- The President of India is the Visitor of all the NITs and IIEST, who also appoints their Chairpersons and Directors as per provisions under the NITSER Act, 2007.
- Council of NITSER headed by Hon'ble HRM, is the apex decision making body comprising the Chairpersons and the Directors NITs & IIEST beside other members including three Members of Parliament.
- The Board of Governors is the apex decision making body in each of these Institutions.
- Senate is empowered to frame and revise curricula and syllabi for the course of studies for various departments and to promote research in academic development activities.
- A large number of rules, regulations, ordinance, policy decisions etc. have been formulated by the Board of Governors, Senate and other authorities of the Institute for regulating the day-to-day work of the expanded activities of the Institute.

== Terms of the Council of NITSER ==
The duration of office of a member is three years from the date of notification provided that the term of office of an ex officio member shall continue so long as he holds office by virtue of which he is such a member and shall expire as soon as he ceases to be Member of the House, which elected him. The term of a member nominated or elected to fill a casual vacancy shall continue for the remainder of the term of the member in whose place he has been appointed and an outgoing member shall, unless the Central Government otherwise directs, continue in office until another person is appointed as a member in his place.

== Function of the Council of NITSER ==
It shall be the general duty of the Council to co-ordinate the activities of all the NITs, IIESTS and IISERs without prejudice. The Council shall perform the following functions, namely:

1. To recommend regulations regarding transactions of business by the Council viz., frequency of meeting, quorum for a meeting and such other connected business transactions;
2. To recommend guidelines and regulations regarding empowerment of Chairman of the Council to deal with specific matters as well as matters of emergency on behalf of the Council in consultation with the Standing Committee;
3. To advise the Chairman of the Council whether an item requires urgent consideration by him.
4. To finalise agenda items for the consideration of the council.
5. To advise the Chairman of the Council on specific items within his purview as well as any emergency matters that may be referred to him;
6. To draft resolutions which would empower the council to make statutes of common policy covering all NITs;
7. To formulate guidelines on items/issues to be considered and approved by the Standing Committee on behalf of the Council;
8. To recommend the structure of the Council's Secretariat for consideration of the Government;
9. To screen all proposals coming within the purview of the Council under the National Institutes of Technology Act, 2007 and make appropriate recommendations to the council;
10. To consider all items within the jurisdiction of the Council and referred by the various Board of Governors of the individual NITs or the individual Directors of the NITs or other groups within the NITs, such as the Senates and the Faculty Associations or the Council for items within his purview for emergent consideration or to the Council itself at a normal scheduled meeting or for final disposal for items delegated to the Standing Committee.

== Member Institutes of the NIT council ==
The NIT council includes the 31 NITs and IIEST Shibpur as follows:

S.no.	Name of the Institute	Abbreviation
1.	Malaviya National Institute of Technology, Jaipur	MNIT
2.	Visvesvaraya National Institute of Technology, Nagpur	VNIT
3.	National Institute of Technology, Jalandhar	NITJ
4.	National Institute of Technology, Raipur	NITRR
5.	National Institute of Technology, Rourkela	NITR
6.	National Institute of Technology, Silchar	NITS
7.	National Institute of Technology, Srinagar	NITSRI
8.	Sardar Vallabhbhai National Institute of Technology, Surat	SVNIT
9.	National Institute of Technology, Karnataka	NITK
10.	National Institute of Technology, Tiruchirappalli	NITT
11.	National Institute of Technology, Warangal	NITW
12.	National Institute of Technology, Delhi	NITD
13.	National Institute of Technology, Mizoram	NITMZ
14.	National Institute of Technology, Sikkim	NITSKM
15.	National Institute of Technology, Puducherry	NITPY
16.	National Institute of Technology, Agartala	NITA
17.	Motilal Nehru National Institute of Technology, Allahabad	MNNIT
18.	National Institute of Technology, Arunachal Pradesh	NITAP
19.	Maulana Azad National Institute of Technology, Bhopal	MANIT
20.	National Institute of Technology, Calicut	NITC
21.	National Institute of Technology, Durgapur	NITDGP
22.	National Institute of Technology, Goa	NITG
23.	National Institute of Technology, Hamirpur	NITH
24.	National Institute of Technology, Manipur	NITMN
25.	National Institute of Technology, Meghalaya	NITM
26.	National Institute of Technology, Nagaland	NITN
27.	National Institute of Technology, Patna	NITP
28.	National Institute of Technology, Jamshedpur	NITJSR
29.	National Institute of Technology, Kurukshetra	NITKKR
30.	National Institute of Technology, Uttarakhand	NITUK
31.	National Institute of Technology, Andhra Pradesh	NITANP
32.	Indian Institute of Engineering, Science and Technology, Shibpur	IIESTS
