= Alok Prasanna Kumar =

Indian legal scholar and public policy professional

- Born: India
- Occupations: Legal scholar, public policy professional, lawyer
- Organization: Vidhi Centre for Legal Policy
- Known for: Founding member of Vidhi Centre for Legal Policy, work in constitutional law and public policy in India

Alok Prasanna Kumar is an Indian legal scholar, lawyer, and public policy professional associated with research and advocacy in constitutional law, governance, and institutional accountability. He has been involved in legal research, public discourse, and policy engagement on issues relating to the Indian Constitution and the functioning of democratic institutions.

== Career ==
Kumar has worked in the fields of constitutional law, governance, and public policy. He has been associated with legal research organisations and policy think tanks, where his work has focused on issues such as judicial accountability, transparency, and institutional reform.

He has been associated with the Vidhi Centre for Legal Policy, where he has contributed to research and public policy initiatives relating to the Indian legal system and governance frameworks.

In addition to his policy work, Kumar has written and commented on legal and constitutional issues in various public forums and media platforms. His work includes analysis of judicial processes, legislative developments, and constitutional interpretation in India.

He has also been involved in academic and educational initiatives, including contributions to curriculum-related discussions and public engagement on legal education.

== Textbook controversy (2026) ==
=== Background ===
In 2026, Kumar was among the contributors to a Class 8 social science textbook titled Exploring Society: India and Beyond, developed under the aegis of the National Council of Educational Research and Training (NCERT).

The textbook included a section addressing themes related to institutional accountability and the judiciary.

=== Supreme Court proceedings ===
Following objections to the content, the Supreme Court of India took suo motu cognisance of the matter and issued directions concerning the circulation and use of the textbook pending further review.

The Court directed the Union and state governments to disassociate from the authors involved in the chapter. Kumar, along with Michel Danino and Suparna Diwakar, was among those named in the direction.

Subsequently, NCERT reconstituted its National Syllabus and Teaching Learning Material Committee (NSTC), removing members associated with the chapter.

The matter remained under judicial consideration at the time, with further proceedings pending.

=== Responses and reactions ===
The developments were reported across multiple media outlets and prompted broader discussions on issues relating to educational content, institutional representation, and academic freedom.

In April 2026, a group of academics wrote to President Droupadi Murmu seeking intervention and expressing concerns about the implications of the actions taken for academic freedom.

== Selected works ==
=== Articles and commentary ===
- Kumar, Alok Prasanna. "Articles and commentary on constitutional law and public policy". Vidhi Centre for Legal Policy.
- Kumar, Alok Prasanna. "Interpreting a federal Constitution". The Hindu.

=== Educational contributions ===
- Contributions to school-level social science textbook Exploring Society: India and Beyond (Class 8), developed under the National Council of Educational Research and Training (NCERT).

== See also ==
- Supreme Court of India
- National Council of Educational Research and Training
- Constitution of India
- Vidhi Centre for Legal Policy
