= PC Jabin College =

Science college in India

Coordinates: 15°22′1.96″N 75°7′20.05″E

P.C. Jabin Science College
- P.C. Jabin College Heritage Building, HUBLI
- Type: Education
- Established: 1957
- Academic affiliations: Karnatak University
- Principal: L.D.Horakeri
- Undergraduates: B.Sc., BCA
- Postgraduates: M.Sc.
- Location: Hubli, Karnataka, India
- Campus: Urban area 9 acres
- Nickname: Jabinians
- Website: www.jabincollege.com

P. C. Jabin Science College is a science college in Hubballi, India run by the KLE Society, Belagavi. It is located in Vidyanagar, Hubballi, next to the KLE Technological University, Hubballi. The college is named after its principal donor Parappa Channappa Jabin of Hubballi. It is recognised under 2F and 12B of the UGC Act, June 1966. The college was reaccredited by NAAC and the UGC awarded the status of "College with Potential for excellence" in 2006. UGC has granted autonomous status to the college.

== Programs ==
- Bachelor of Science.
- Bachelor of Computer Applications.
- Master of Science (Bio-Tech).
- Master of Science (Computer Science).
- Master of Science (Organic Chemistry).
- Master of Science (Physics).

== Facilities ==
The college building consists of a library, laboratories, classrooms and a garden spread over 8 acres (32,000 m^{2}). Every department is provided with a staff room, a library, a computer and a separate chamber for the head of the department. The garden has medicinal plants and aquaculture. The college also provides a few student - amenities like a bank, a canteen, a post office, drinking water, a career guidance bureau, a counselling cell and a placement cell.

- Library - The college library has a collection of 58,000 books and 500 periodicals, in an independent building. The establishment of a Digital Library is in process and will have an Open Access System. A special provision will be made to help the poor and deserving students, SC/ ST students, etc., by providing, every year, a set of text books each for one complete year. The library will be provided with audio, video, internet and photocopying facilities. The Digital Library will give access to 6,000 e-journals through the internet. It will cater to the needs of both the students and the faculty. It will be useful for the members of the faculty in their research. It will be computerized with a library management software, with an O. P. A. C. (Online Public Access Catalog) system, which will help the students and staff search for a book.
- Language Lab – It has 24 computers.
- Hostel accommodation for both boys and girls – Both girls and boys have hostels. The boys' hostel can accommodate 75 boys. The ladies' hostel can accommodate 280 students. Both the hostels are in the vicinity of the College.
- Student Support Service – Co-curricular and extra curricular activities.

Extra curricular activities like sports, debates, etc., are conducted by the College Union, which consists of various students' associations and a gym. These bodies meet periodically to chalk out programs. Every student on the rolls is a member of a 'College Union' which coordinates the participation of the students in co-curricular and extra-curricular activities. The student representatives nominated by the committee constituted by the Principal collect suggestions of students.

Other activities such as seminars, symposia, lectures by experts, etc., are organized through the subject associations - Physical Society, Chemical Society, Mathematical Society, Zoological Society, Botanical Society, Statistical Society and the Karnataka Rajya Vijnana Parishath (Karnataka State Science Foundation). The college magazine, called "College Miscellany" has a Chief Editor. The students contribute articles on various subjects and general topics and can also send their suggestions for improvement of the magazine, directly to the Editor.

== NCC / NSS ==
The college offers NCC training as well as participation in the NSS and community service schemes. The students are advised to join either NCC or NSS and also to take an active part in sports in their own interest as certain percentage of seats are reserved for admission to professional colleges and Post Graduate courses. Such students are also given preference in the appointments in many departments.

Co-Operative Consumers Society The Co-Operative Consumers Society of the college sells articles which are useful to students.
