= Adamya Chethana Foundation =

Indian non-profit organisation

Adamya Chetana
- ಅದಮ್ಯ ಚೇತನ ಫೌಂಡೇಶನ್
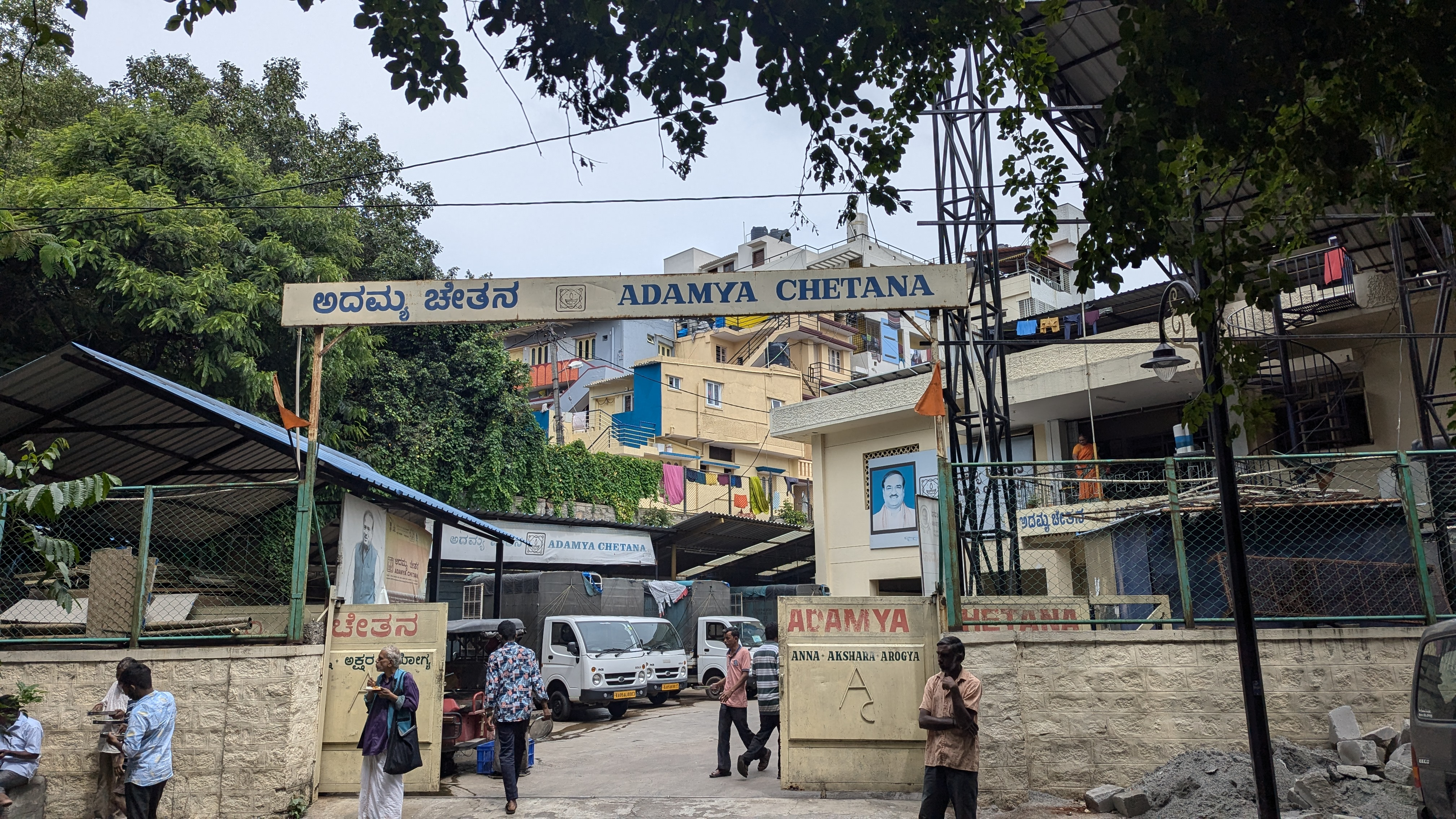
- Formation: 1997
- Founder: Ananth Kumar and Tejaswini AnanthKumar
- Type: nonprofit organization
- Purpose: Social welfare
- Headquarters: Bangalore
- Region served: India
- Website: www.adamyachetana.org

Adamya Chetana is a non-profit organisation based in Bangalore, India. The foundation has engaged in various projects in education and social sectors in the key areas of food, literature, health, nature, and culture. It was founded in 1997 by Indian politician Ananth Kumar in memory of his mother Girija Shastri. The organization focuses on various social welfare activities. Tejaswini Ananth Kumar has been serving as the Managing Trustee since the day of inception.

Founders Elected 6 times consecutively from Bangalore South Constituency, Mr Ananthakumar, who served as a Cabinet Grade Minister in the cabinet of Mr Atal Bihari Vajpayee and Mr Narendra Modi founded the organization "Adamya Chetana" in 1997 in memory of his mother, Mrs. Girija Shastri.

== Annapurna ==
Under the Annapurna scheme launched in 2003, in collaboration with the central and state governments, a total of 1,60,000 children are being supplied with clean and nutritious midday meals every afternoon from kitchen centers in Bengaluru, Hubli, Kalaburagi and Jodhpur of Rajasthan. Due to this scheme, attendance in schools has increased and there has been significant improvement in children's health and the quality of learning. The organization provides meals to thousands of students in various government and government-aided schools in Bangalore and other parts of Karnataka.

== Sustainable initiatives ==
The use of fossil fuel has been completely banned in the Annapurna cooking center and 60 cylinders or 30 liters of diesel/petrol per day has been completely stopped since 2008. Using garbage as fuel, cooking is done entirely with renewable fossil-free fuel.

Garbage-free Kitchen: 2010 it boasts a spirit to be a completely garbage-free kitchen, with no waste given to the municipal corporation. Thanks to the successful zero-waste kitchen experiment, hundreds of kitchens in Bangalore have been converted into zero-waste kitchens. The water from which the rice is washed and is applied to the plants without spoiling them. A vehicle has been reserved for this, besides planting trees, encouraging organic farming and promoting waste management and recycling.

== Health ==
The organization conducts health camps and provides medical assistance to underprivileged communities, provides free health check-ups, distributes medicines and creates awareness about health and hygiene. In the context of the pandemic covid wave that shocked mankind, the organization performed its social responsibility. The kitchen was staffed by volunteers during the first wave of the COVID-19 lockdown. Every day 20,000 food packets were made and distributed to the people of Bangalore. 28,000 food packets were also distributed and more than 7,00,000 meals were provided. This food was distributed especially to homeless workers and students of North India. During the second wave of Covid 16,00 food packages and provided meals to 70,000 people every day for 40 days. Meals were delivered to the Covid fighters like doctors, nurses, lifeguards, Rudrabhoomi Sevakartas and the victims of Covid at their place of residence. 6,500 meals were provided continuously for 40 days

== Education ==
It supports education by providing school supplies, scholarships and learning resources to the needed students. Coaching classes and skill development programs are also conducted to enhance the academic results of the students

== Women empowerment ==
The organization helps women through various initiatives like vocational training, self-help groups and awareness programs on health and rights.

== Plate bank ==
Plastic cups and plates are used for meals and snacks in most gatherings, in some places walnut plates are used. But due to this, the amount of garbage is increasing. These are not being recycled properly, causing environmental pollution in the city. As an alternative to this, around 10,000 steel plates, spoons and cups have been purchased and stored at Adamya Chetana. These steel plates will be provided free of cost for the use of food in any meetings and functions held in the city. Use sparingly – reuse is the mantra of an irrepressible spirit

== Achievements ==
Adamya Chetana was recognized for its impressive work in the community, especially in the successful implementation of the midday meal program.

The organization has expanded its reach to serve meals to tens of thousands of children every day, contributing significantly to their nutritional needs and education.

The Karnataka government has honored the institution with the Amrita Mahotsava State Award

The President praised the foundation's food donation and health service work.

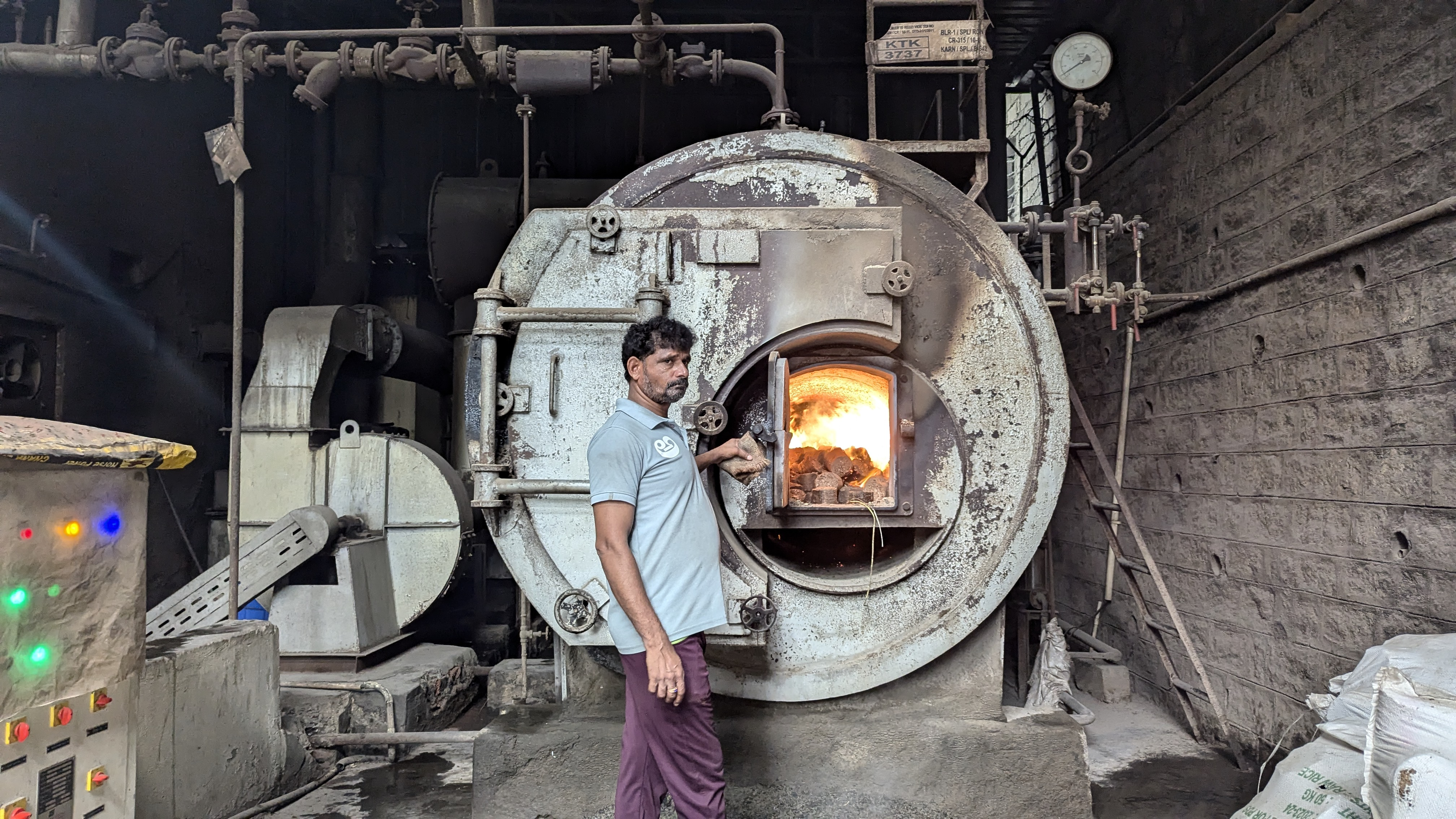
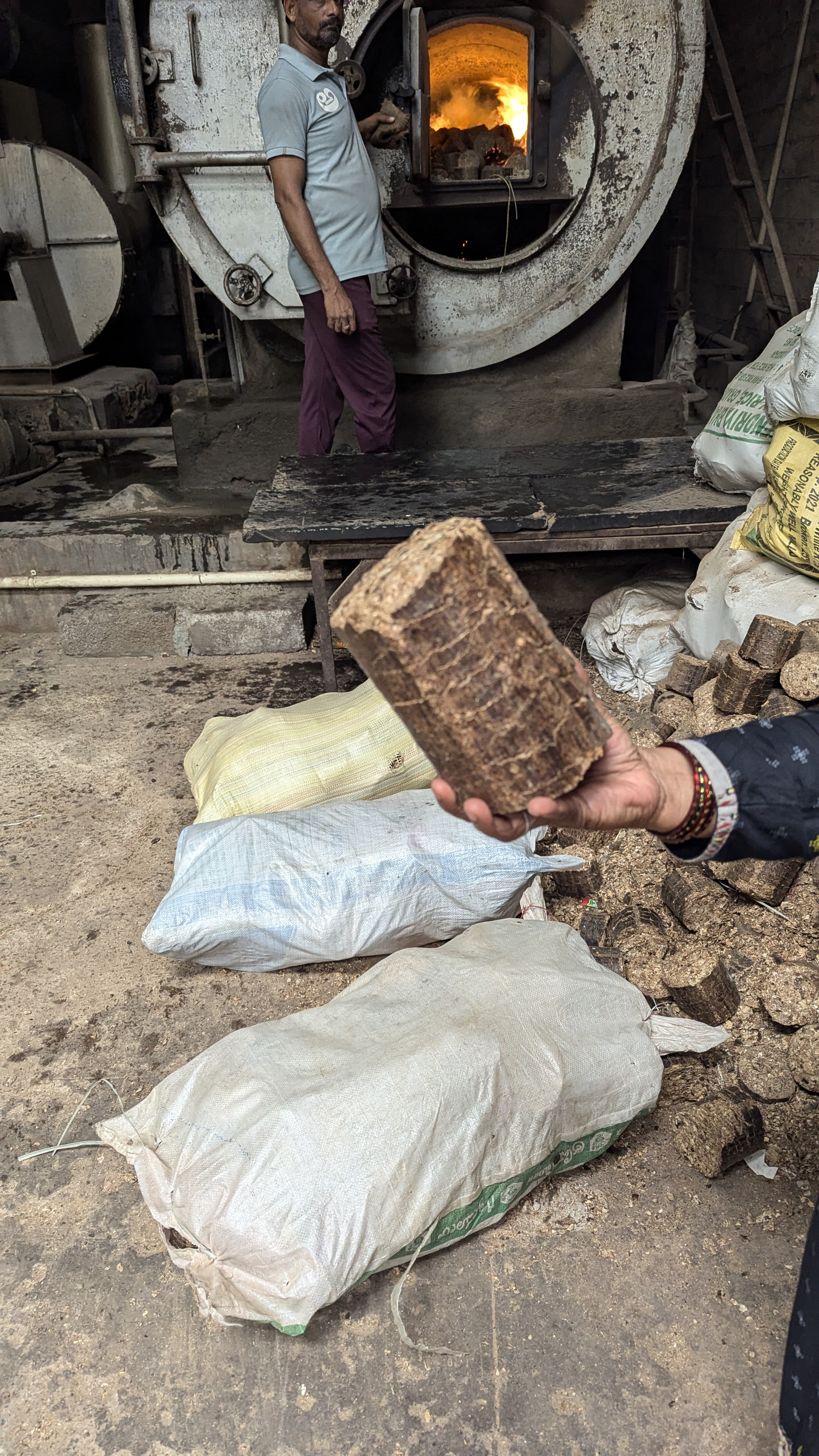

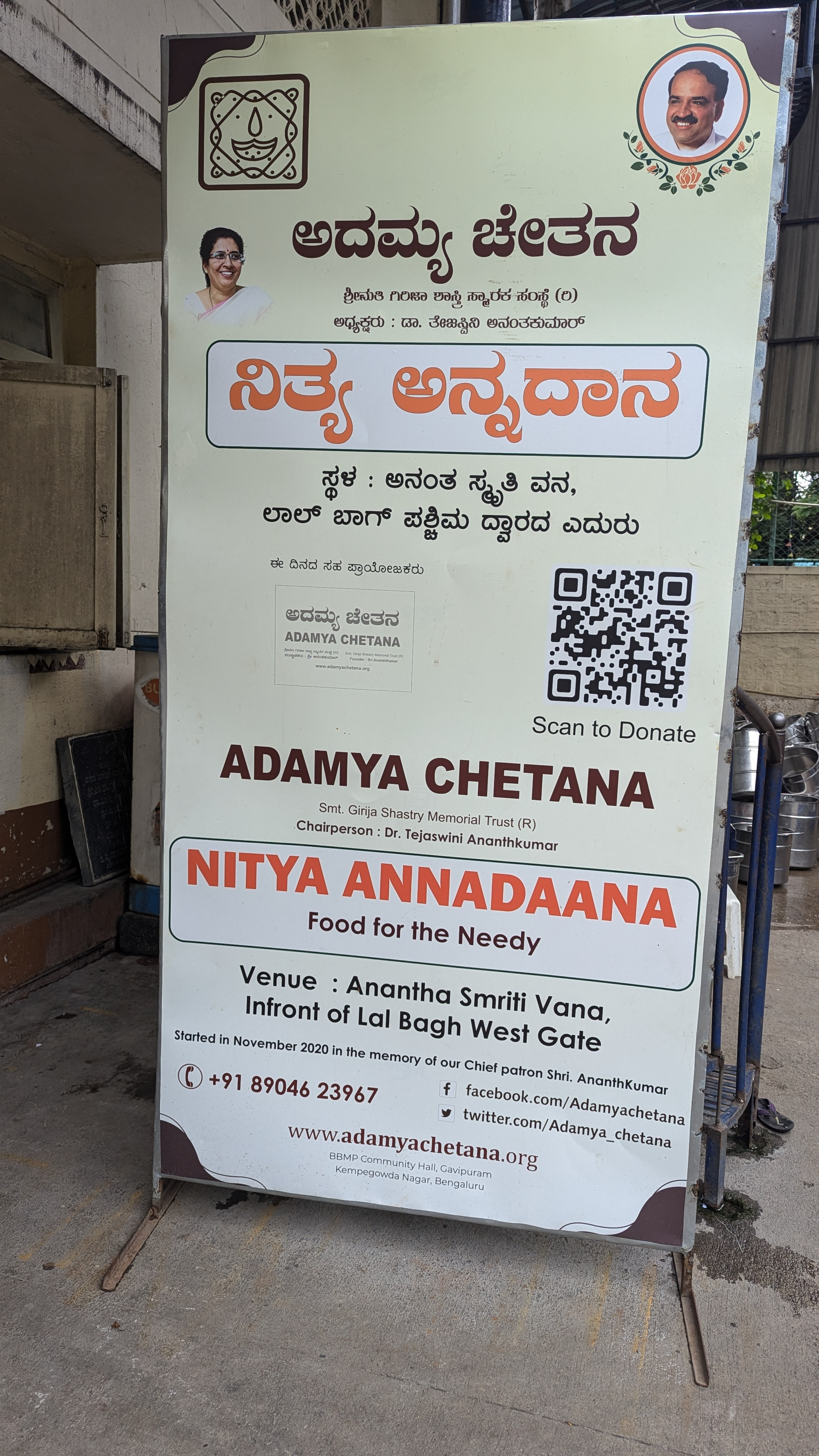
Free meal for citizens

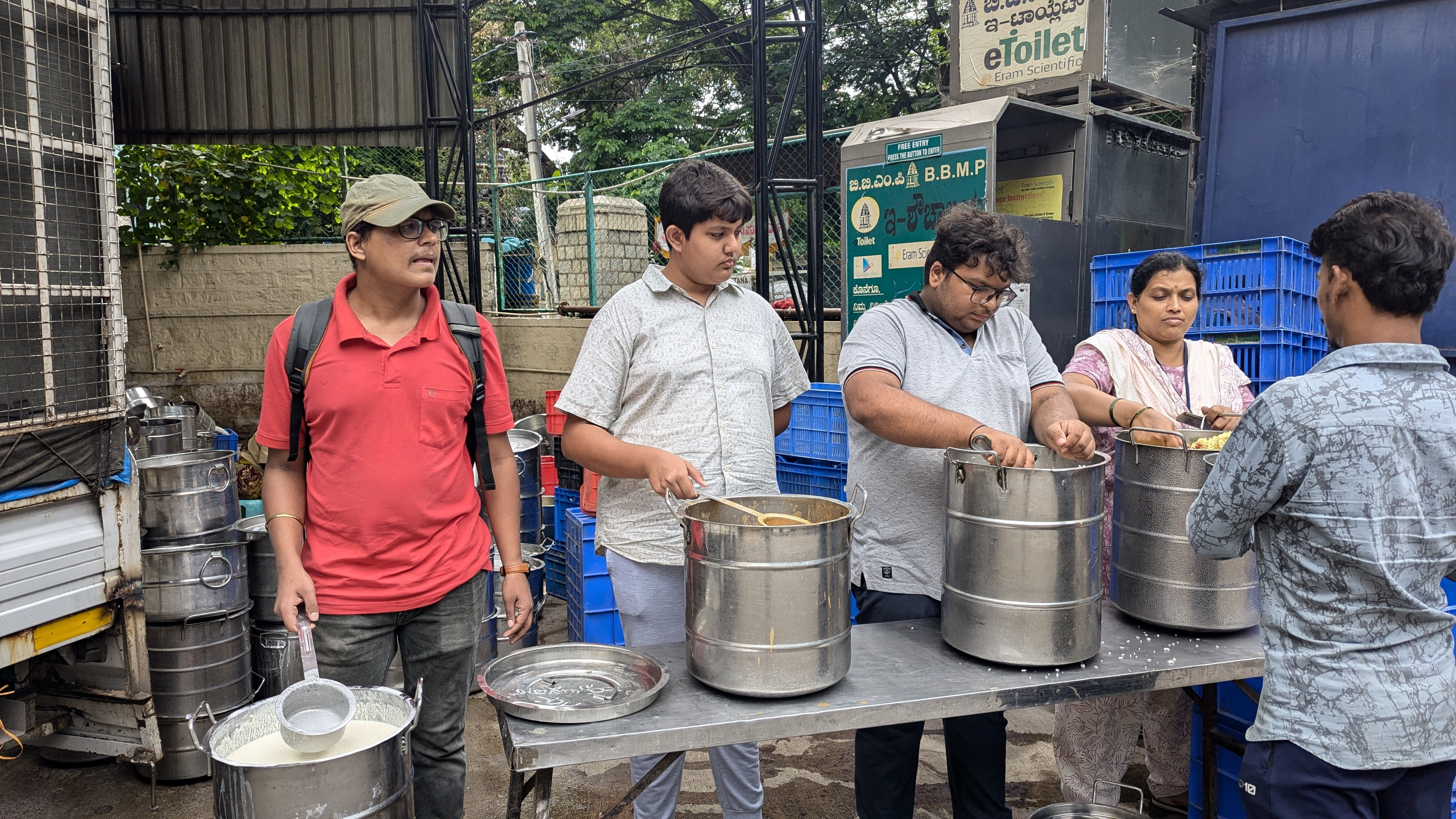

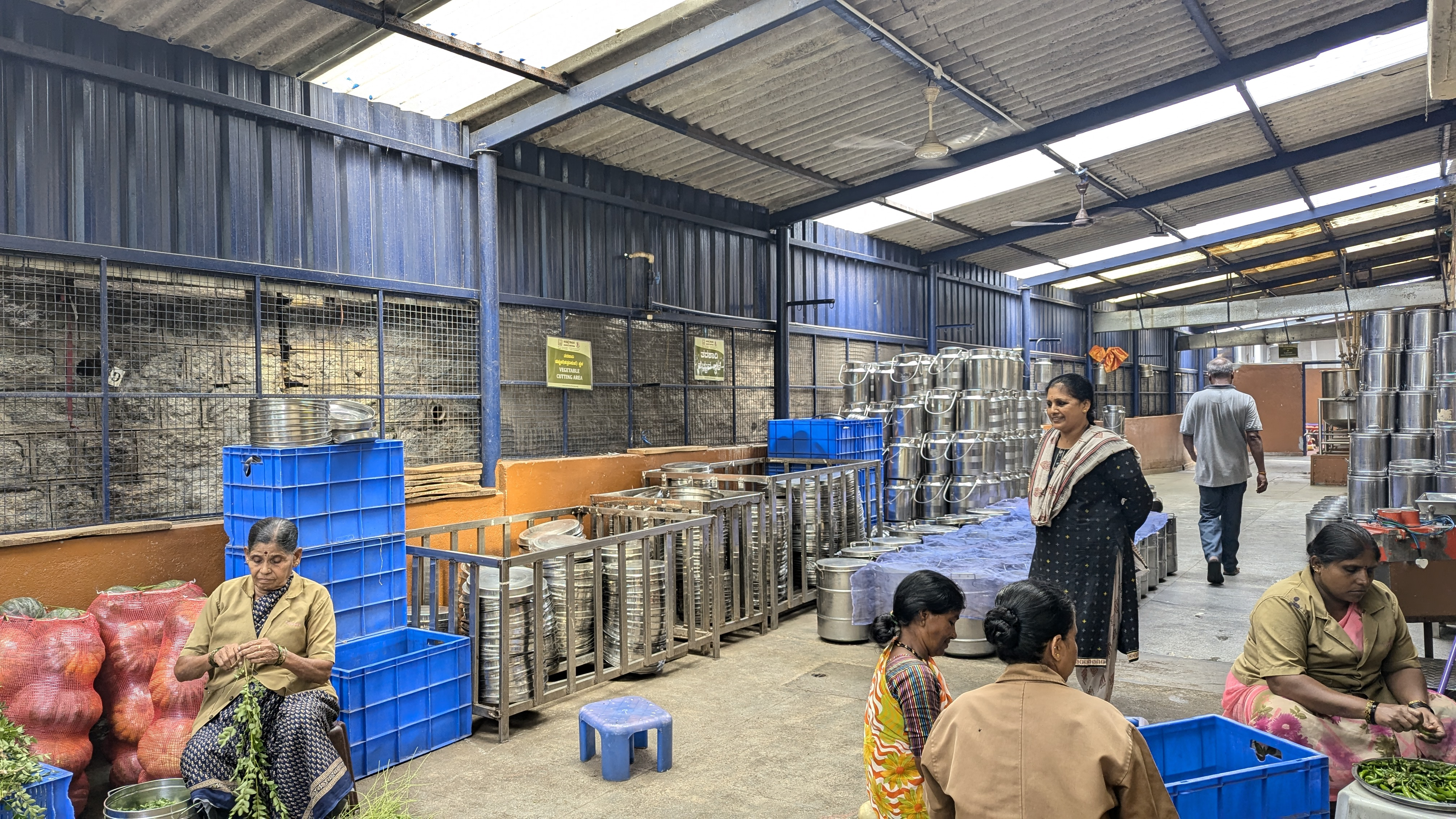
Workers in the Kitchen

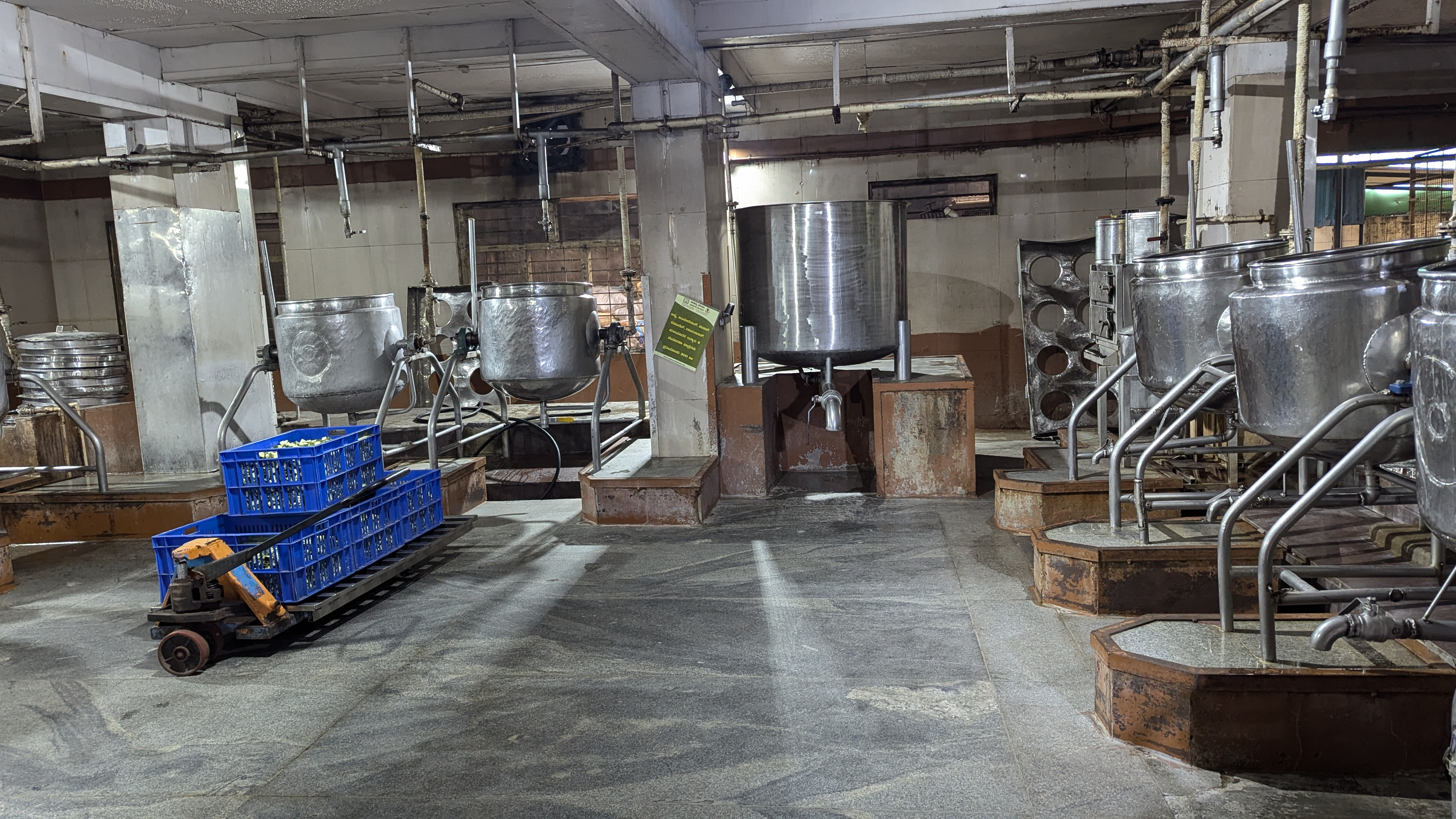
