= IIEST, Shibpur =

Research university in West Bengal, India

Indian Institute of Engineering Science and Technology, Shibpur
- Former names: List: Civil Engineering College (1856-1921); Bengal Engineering College, University of Calcutta (1921-2005); Bengal Engineering and Science University (2005-2014)
- Motto: Uttiṣṭhata jāgrata prāpya varān nibodhata
- Motto in English: Arise, awake, and stop not till the goal is reached
- Type: Public research university
- Established: 24 November 1856; 169 years ago
- Academic affiliations: AIU; INI
- Budget: ₹245 crore (US$26.2 million) (2026–27)
- Chairperson: Tejaswini Ananth Kumar
- Director: V. M. S. R. Murthy
- Academic staff: 261 (2025)
- Students: 4,229 (2025)
- Undergraduates: 2,830 (2025)
- Postgraduates: 578 (2025)
- Doctoral students: 821 (2025)
- Location: Shibpur, West Bengal, India; 22°33′21″N 88°18′20″E
- Campus: Metropolis 123 acres (50 ha)
- Colours: Violet & Gold
- Nickname: BE college
- Mascot: Clock tower
- Website: www.iiests.ac.in

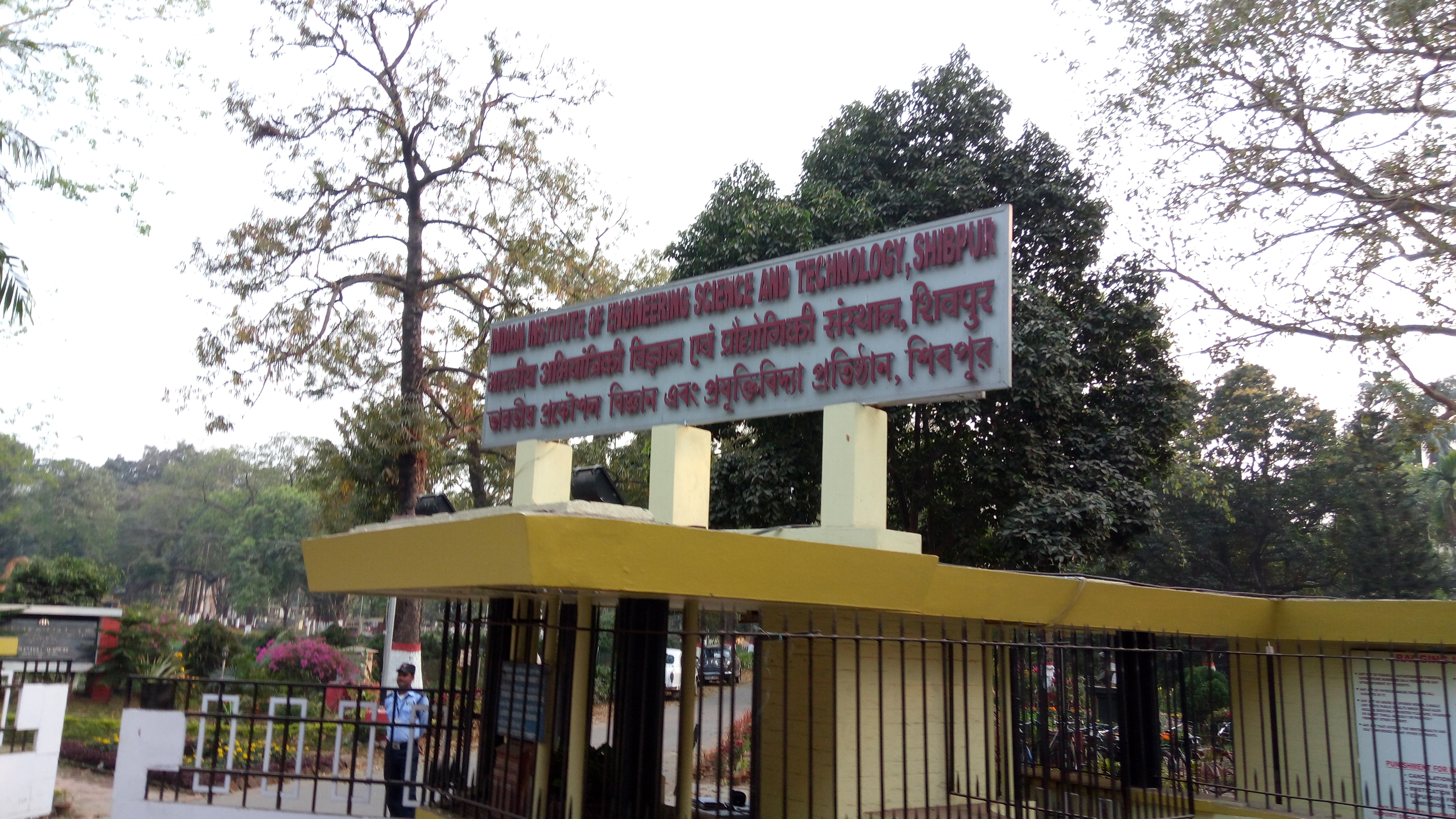
IIEST main entrance in Shibpur, Howrah.

Indian Institute of Engineering Science and Technology, Shibpur (abbr. IIEST Shibpur or IIESTS) is a public technological research university located at Shibpur, Howrah, West Bengal, India. Founded in 1856, it is one of the Institutes of National Importance funded by the Ministry of Education of the Government of India. It is regulated by the Council of NITSER. It is the fourth oldest engineering institute in India. In October 2010, the Union Cabinet approved the proposal for the conversion of the Bengal Engineering and Science University (BESU) at Shibpur to India's first Indian Institute of Engineering Science and Technology (IIEST). IIEST is a member of the Association of Indian Universities. IIEST Shibpur was later included in the NIT Council.

== History ==
Directors
- Ajoy Kumar Ray, 2014–2018
- Parthasarathi Chakrabarti, 2018–2024
- Vemavarapu M. S. R. Murthy, 2024–present

The university was founded as the Civil Engineering College on 24 November 1856, in the Writers' Building, Calcutta (now Kolkata). The college was established as an independent entity in 1880 as Government College, Howrah, on the premises of Bishop's College in Shibpur, Howrah. In 1921, the name of the college was changed to Bengal Engineering College. B.E. College was previously affiliated to the University of Calcutta. At that time, it contained only civil and mechanical engineering departments. Classes used to be held in the Writers' Building. Later, from 1865 to 1869, the college was affiliated to Presidency College, Calcutta. Historically, IIEST Shibpur pioneered engineering frameworks that heavily mentored the initial establishment of IIT Kharagpur. Several other departments were created subsequently over the years, the last among them being that of Aerospace Engineering and Applied Mechanics in 2010.

Following an endorsement from a UGC Expert Committee, the Ministry of Human Resource Development designated the institution as a Deemed University in 1992, marking a significant milestone in its academic evolution.

Established in November 2003, the S.K. Joshi Committee was mandated by the Government of India to evaluate and shortlist premier engineering institutions for potential elevation to the status of an Indian Institute of Technology (IIT). Ultimately, the committee identified seven candidate institutions for this strategic upgradation, most notably including the Bengal Engineering College.

On October 1, 2004, the institution was accorded the status of a comprehensive state university. It was formally inaugurated as Bengal Engineering and Science University by A. P. J. Abdul Kalam, the President of India, on 13 July 2005.

On 2009 Chief Minister Buddhadeb Bhattacharjee has requested the Union Human Resource Development Minister, Arjun Singh, to reconsider the proposal to upgrade Bengal Engineering and Science University (BESU) to a central university.

=== Post 2010 ===
In October 2010, the Union Cabinet ratified the 2006 M. Anandakrishnan Committee’s proposal to transform the Bengal Engineering and Science University (BESU), Shibpur, into India’s inaugural Indian Institute of Engineering Science and Technology (IIEST). This strategic evolution was designed to establish an institution of international prestige, dedicated to cultivating elite human capital for the nation’s strategic sectors. Beyond technical training, the mandate envisioned the development of advanced research laboratories and the nurturing of distinguished educators to elevate the standards of engineering and science education nationwide. An amount of ₹ 592.20 crore was earmarked for the project, and it was to be completed over a period of five years.

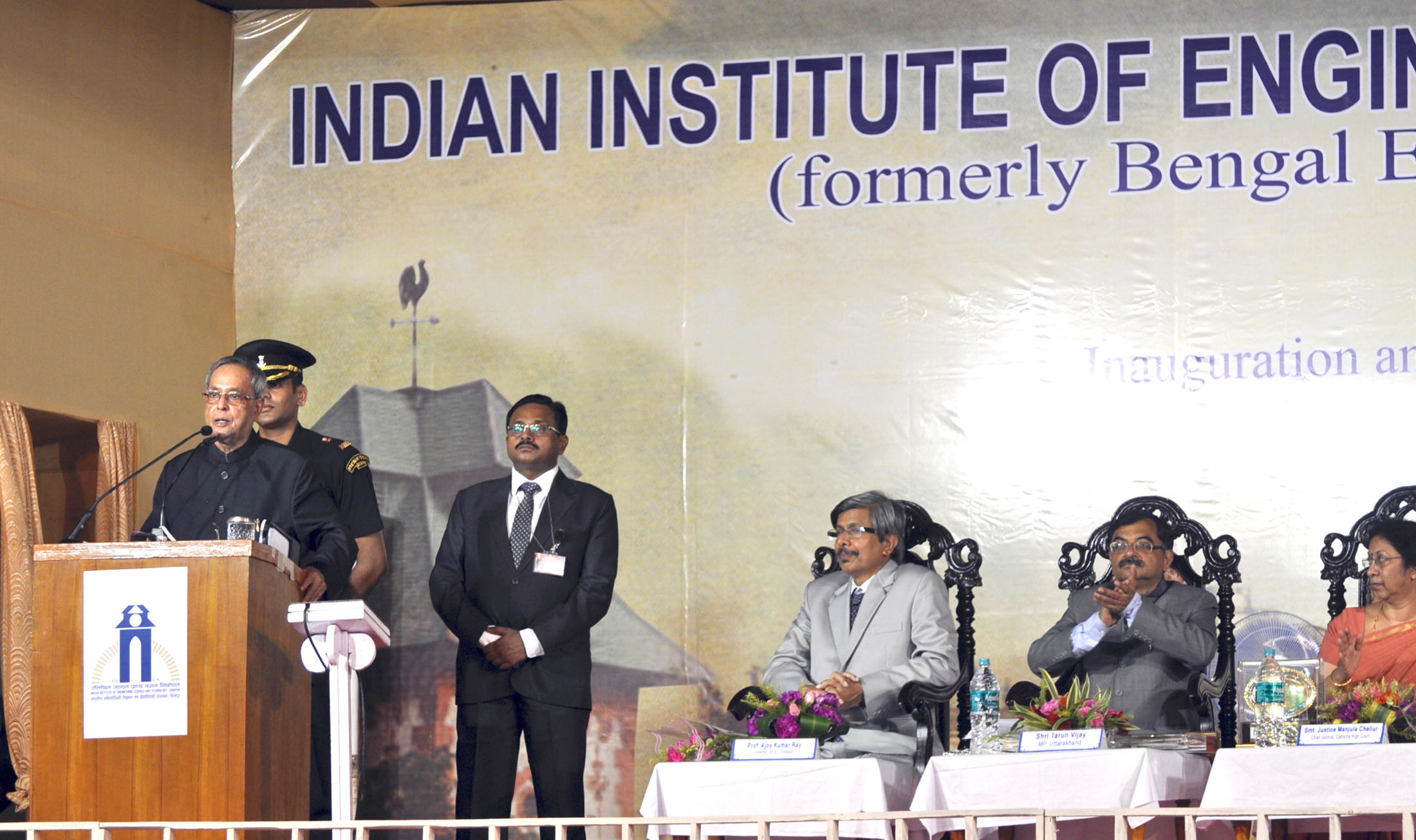
President Pranab Mukherjee addressed the inaugural ceremony of the IIEST, Shibpur at Howrah, on August 24, 2014.

In March 2014, the institute was conferred the status of an INI and was renamed Indian Institute of Engineering Science and Technology, Shibpur by the Govt. of India by suitably amending the National Institutes of Technology and Science Education and Research Act, 2007. It was governed by the NIT Council. The conversion process of BESU to IIEST was mentored by IIT Kanpur. The President of India, Pranab Mukherjee, inaugurated it as IIEST on 24 August 2014.

In June 2014, the Government of West Bengal formally inaugurated the Indian Institute of Information Technology Kalyani. Concurrently, the Indian Institute of Engineering Science and Technology (IIEST), Shibpur, was appointed as its mentor institution to provide foundational academic and administrative guidance during its establishment.

In December 2014, the institute's founding director Ajoy Kumar Ray, in a sorrowful tone, said, "We have the fund now, but land-space crunch is the biggest problem. We have 121 acres of land with us and we need 100 acres more. Otherwise, the institute's expansion would be pretty critical."

In 2017, Professor Ajoy Kumar Ray, the founding director of the IIEST Shibpur, was awarded the Padma Shri. This prestigious civilian honor recognized his significant contributions to the field of science and engineering.

In 2019, the government abandoned the plan to establish a separate category of IIEST institutes, and thus IIEST Shibpur was integrated into the NIT Council making it the first non-NIT member of the Council.

=== Recalibration ===
The transition of IIEST Shibpur into an Institute of National Importance (INI) in 2014 was anchored by a bold "Research-Only" campus ambition. The vision was to depart from the traditional undergraduate model and emulate elite global research centers, where every student would be groomed for high-level innovation through a mandatory five-year integrated B.Tech-M.Tech program. However, this academic idealism soon triggered a significant policy flip-flop. While the conversion bill passed in Parliament originally intended for the institute to receive approximately ₹ 600 Cr in funding to support this transformation, the MHRD ultimately failed to provide the promised capital. This financial shortfall, combined with rigid academic frameworks, eventually collided with the practicalities of student mobility and industry preferences.

Under the subsequent leadership of Professor Parthasarathi Chakrabarti, the administration reconciled these lofty goals with the necessity of academic flexibility. By "restarting" the four-year B.Tech, the institute corrected its course, providing the modularity later championed by the National Education Policy 2020. Today, IIEST operates as a hybrid entity, honoring its research-centric roots while offering standardized pathways that empower students to choose between immediate professional entry or extended academic specialization.

The executive council of the Institute resolved to adopt the JEE Advanced for its dual-degree programs, seeking to attract premier research-oriented students. This strategy intended to place the institute alongside elite peers like IISc, IIST, RGIPT and IISERs. However, then the HRD Ministry declined the request, mandating the Shibpur campus to follow the JEE Main route. Director Ajoy Kumar Ray noted that because the ministry integrated IIEST into the NIT Council, the institute was required to settle for the broader admission framework, diverging from its original preference.

=== Current Status ===
As of 2026, IIEST is commonly called the unofficial "32nd NIT" because of its equivalent status to NITs (in terms of funding and administration, as both are governed by the NIT Act) and its inclusion in the NIT Council. It is also subsequently tagged under the NIT category by both JoSAA and CSAB.

== Campus ==
A master plan proposed along with the existing campus layout was presented. Five new infrastructure projects were planned, and some are ongoing, including a 1000-seat girls' hostel, an academic block, a research and innovation park, and an auditorium and convention hall. The total estimated cost is ₹ 787 crore.

=== Salt Lake campus ===
During the institute’s convocation in December 2024, the Governor formally announced the establishment of a secondary IIEST campus in Salt Lake, Sector III. Spanning 38.5 kattahs, this strategic expansion is designed to bridge the gap between theory and practice by fostering robust academia-industry collaborations. The facility will serve as a specialized hub for innovation, offering tailored part-time programs and professional development courses curated specifically for working professionals. By situating this annex in a prominent commercial district, the institute aims to cultivate a dynamic ecosystem where academic research and industrial application converge to drive regional technological advancement.

== Organisation and administration ==
=== Governance ===
Like all NITs, the institute follows an organizational structure where the President of India is the ex officio visitor of IIEST Shibpur, at the top of the hierarchy. Directly under the president is the Council of NITSER. Under the Council of NITSER is the Board of Governors of IIEST, Shibpur. The Board of Governors consists of the chairperson, director, and twelve members, which include government, industry, alumni, and faculty representation. The Senate Standing Committee comprises the director, the Secretary to the Senate, deans, department heads, and the registrar. In September 2023, Tejaswini Ananth Kumar was appointed as chairperson of the Board of Governors of the Institution for a period of three years.

The Board of Governors is the apex body, responsible for setting the strategic direction and overseeing the institute's overall performance. This board comprises individuals from academia, industry, and government. Complementing the Board of Governors is the Academic Council, which focuses on academic policies, curriculum development, and the maintenance of educational standards. The council ensures that the institute's programs remain relevant and aligned with the latest advancements in technology and science. Financial management is handled by the Finance Committee, which oversees budgeting, resource allocation, and financial planning.

=== Departments ===
Departments of IIEST, Shibpur
Aerospace Engineering and Applied Mechanics; Architecture and Planning; Chemistry; Civil Engineering	Computer Science and Technology; Earth Sciences; Electrical Engineering; Electronics and Telecommunication Engineering	Human Resource Management; Humanities and Social Sciences; Information Technology; Mathematics	Mechanical Engineering; Metallurgy and Materials Engineering; Mining Engineering; Physics

=== Schools ===
Eight 'schools of excellence' in IIEST are:

Schools of IIEST, Shibpur
School of Advanced Materials, Green Energy and Sensor Systems; Purabi Das School of Information Technology; School of Community Science and Technology; School of Disaster Mitigation Engineering	School of Ecology, Infrastructure and Human Settlement Management; School of Management Sciences; School of Mechatronics and Robotics; School of VLSI Technology

=== Centres ===
Following are the multi-disciplinary centers located in IIEST Shibpur:

- Center of Healthcare Science and Technology
- Chirasree Centre of Sustainable Infrastructure Development
- Arun and Dhriti Deb Centre of Water and Environmental Studies

== Academics ==
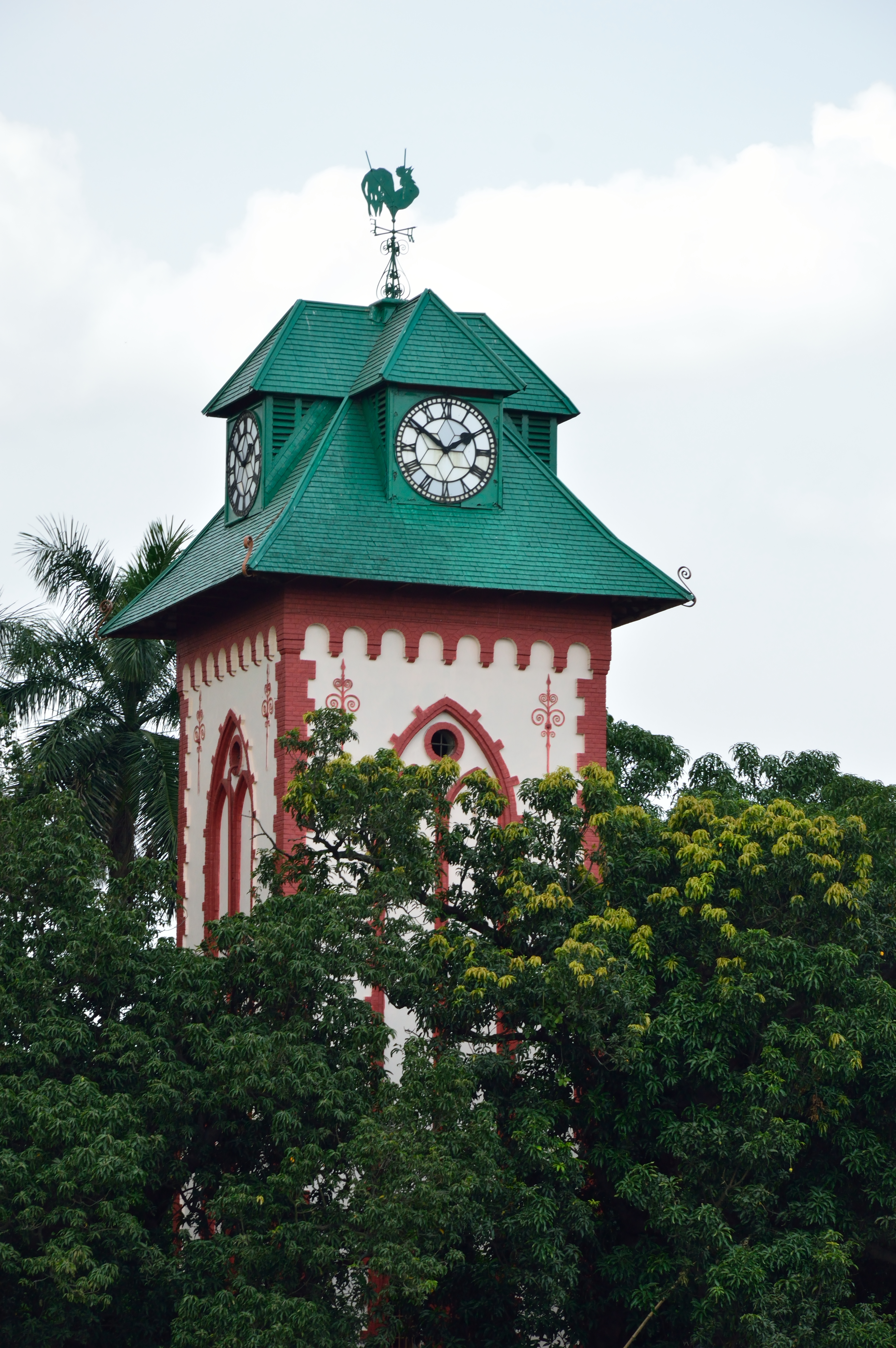
The Clock Tower, IIEST

=== Ramanujan Central Library ===
The institute's Ramanujan Central Library occupies 3,000 m^{2} (32,000 ft^{2}) and houses 158,000 books, 41,000 bound volumes of journals, and a collection of documents, such as patents, standards, technical reports, and pamphlets. The library has old and rare books and journals of the nineteenth century. As a member of the e-ShodhSindhu consortium, the library provides access to over 6,500 full-text e-journals. This includes major databases such as IEEE Xplore, ScienceDirect (Elsevier), and Scopus.

=== Admission procedure ===
Undergraduate programs to the various engineering disciplines (4-year B.Tech. programs) and architecture (5-year B.Arch. program) are granted via JEE Main, taking 50% students from the home state (West Bengal) and 50% from other states. For PG programs, admission is through the GATE for M.Tech courses, and the Joint Admission Test for Masters for MSc programme in Physics, Chemistry, Applied Mathematics, Applied Geology, Food Processing, and Nutrition Science. Students are also admitted in Ph.D. programs twice a year through online applications.

The BS–MS Integrated Programme at IIEST Shibpur is a five-year multidisciplinary curriculum introduced in 2026 under NEP 2020. Offered in Physics, Chemistry, and Geology, it features multiple exit points and dual admission pathways via JEE Main and the IISER Aptitude Test.

In 2026, The Institution introduced a four-year Bachelor of Technology program in Mathematics and Computing. Admission to the forty-seat cohort is determined through the Joint Entrance Examination – Main via JoSAA and CSAB counselling.

=== Ranking and reputation ===
IIEST Shibpur was ranked in the 401–450 band among the top universities in the Asia category by the QS Asia Ranking 2024.

In India, IIEST Shibpur was ranked 54th among engineering institutes by the NIRF (National Institutional Ranking Framework) rankings in 2025 and 4th in Architecture & Planning.

=== Academic collaboration ===
In November 2016, IIEST Shibpur and Hiroshima University (HU) formally established an International Exchange Agreement to enhance academic and research cooperation. Represented by Professor Hafizur Rahaman and HU President Mitsuo Ochi, the partnership builds on existing links through the HiSENS Research Center and the TAOYAKA Program. This collaboration focuses on semiconductor technology, sensor research, and doctoral human resource development, fostering a robust innovation bridge between India and Japan that continues through joint symposiums like ISDCS. In 2017, the institute collaborated with the US-based University of California, Irvine, and signed an MoU to offer dual degree programmes from both universities.

== Research ==
IIEST, Shibpur remains a premier hub for interdisciplinary research in India. Its research ecosystem is characterized by a shift toward sustainable infrastructure, green energy, and advanced healthcare technology, supported by significant recent private endowments and government grants. In May 2017, the Ministry of AYUSH authorized an ₹11 crore grant for the establishment of the Dr. Bholanath Chakroborty Fundamental Research Laboratory on Homeopathy. This strategic investment aims to bolster the scientific infrastructure of homeopathic medicine, facilitating advanced empirical research and academic inquiry into its foundational principles.

In a landmark moment for the IIEST, Shibpur, the institute received a significant private endowment of ₹8.6 crore ($1 million) in January 2025. This contribution was made by Dr. Arun Deb, a distinguished 1957 Civil Engineering alumnus and former faculty member, to establish the Arun and Dhriti Deb Center of Water and Environmental Studies (ADDCWES). The center’s mandate encompasses critical areas such as groundwater arsenic mitigation, wastewater recycling, and sustainable sanitation solutions.

Chirasree Centre for Sustainable Infrastructure Development (CCSID) is a cutting-edge, multidisciplinary research hub at IIEST Shibpur. Formally inaugurated on March 29, 2025, it was established to tackle the urgent global challenges of climate change and rapid urbanization through "frugal" and sustainable engineering.

In 2026, the institute has emerged as a critical player in the Partnerships for Accelerated Innovation and Research (PAIR) program. This initiative, launched by the Anusandhan National Research Foundation (ANRF), is a flagship "Hub-and-Spoke" model designed to elevate the research standards of Indian universities through strategic mentorship. Through the IISc-led PAIR network, IIEST Shibpur is actively involved in transdisciplinary research.

The CSIR-Structural Engineering Research Centre, Chennai, signed a MoU with The Institution on August 17, 2026, to advance collaborative research and technological innovation. The partnership focused on integrating cutting-edge structural engineering, advanced materials, and sustainable design into academic programs while expanding joint R&D initiatives, specialized training, and hands-on facility access for scholars.

== Institute-Industry partnership ==
The 2015 convocation at IIEST Shibpur heralded a transformative epoch in Indian technical education. By formalizing six strategic MoUs with industrial titans like BHEL and Garden Reach Shipbuilders, the institute bridged the historical chasm between ivory-tower theory and pragmatic application. These MoUs served as sophisticated blueprints for synergy, integrating specialized curricula—ranging from naval architecture to VLSI design—directly into the academic fabric. Under the aegis of the President of India, this collaborative framework redefined the "Industry-Institute" relationship, ensuring that graduates emerged not merely as degree-holders, but as industry-ready innovators equipped for a burgeoning global economy.

In April 2017, an MoU was signed between the Institute and the Indian Paint Association for a Master's Programme in Coating Sciences & Technology from the academic session 2017. Joint research projects would also be undertaken. In October 2020, an MoU was signed between the Institute and IBM for collaboration on research, development of learning content, software, and faculty training. To promote research and innovation, particularly in the Micro, Small and Medium Enterprises sector in the state of West Bengal, a collaboration MoU was signed between the institute and the state-based advocacy group Bengal Chamber of Commerce and Industry at the Bengal Chamber Premises.

The Indo-German Living Lab Initiative has launched at IIEST Shibpur in partnership with GIZ Germany. Designed to boost MSME growth, the program drives AI-powered collaboration and Industry 4.0 adoption between Indian and German enterprises. Following upcoming international faculty exchanges and formal institutional agreements, the initiative will officially commence operations in early 2027 to advance sustainable industrial innovation. On September 22, 2026, Institution partnered with Tata Consultancy Services by signing a MoU to establish an Artificial Intelligence Centre of Excellence, fostering advanced research, industry-aligned training, and student internships in cutting-edge computing.

== Student Life ==
Established in 1932, REBECA (Reunion and Bengal Engineering College Annuals) stands as India's oldest student-led festival. Spanning four days, the festival includes music, dance competitions, and literary events, among others.

== Notable people ==
=== Notable faculty ===
- John Samuel Slater, principal
- Sankar Sen, professor of the electrical engineering department.
- Joseph Allen Stein, professor and head of the Department of Architecture
- Asok Kumar Barua, condensed matter physicist and honorary Emeritus Professor.
- Sabyasachi Sarkar, Former Professor, Nano Science and Synthetic Leaf Laboratory of the Institute.

=== Notable alumni ===
- Amitabha Bhattacharyya, 4th Director of IIT Kanpur and Shanti Swarup Bhatnagar awardee.
- Bimal Kumar Bose, scholar in Power Electronics, Chondra Chair of Excellence in Power Electronics, professor emeritus at the University of Tennessee, member of National Academy of Engineering
- Chaitanyamoy Ganguly, Indian nuclear scientist and a former head of the Nuclear Fuel Cycle and Materials Section of the International Atomic Energy Agency (IAEA).
- Gautam Biswas, former Director of IIT Guwahati
- Loqman Husain, telecommunications engineer, first Secretary of the Ministry of Posts, Telegraphs and Telephones of Bangladesh, and inaugural Executive Director of the Asia-Pacific Telecommunity
- Rajen Mookerjee, industrialist, co-founder of Martin Burn & Co. and founder of Indian Iron & Steel Co. Ltd.
- Satish Chandra Samanta, foremost freedom fighter, revolutionary, established the Tamralipta Jatiya Sarkar during the Quit India Movement.
- Gagan Chandra Biswas, industrialist, engineer, businessman and Zamindar.
- Shankar Nath Rimal, Nepalese civil engineer, designer of the modern Nepalese flag
- Jatindranath Sengupta, poet and writer.
- Krishna Mohan Banerjee, Indian thinker who attempted to rethink Hindu philosophy, religion and ethics in response to the stimulus of Christian ideas.
- Fazlur Rahman Khan, called the "Father of Structural Engineering" by the American Society of Civil Engineers.
- Renuka Dasgupta, singer
- Nandini Mukherjee is an Indian computer scientist and politician.
- Abhijit Chowdhury, film director and writer
- Narayan Sanyal, Academy Award winner and famous writer of Biswasghatak, "Dandak Shabari", and "Shyatakam"
- Binoy Majumdar, Bengali poet, author, winner of the Sahitya Akademi Award.
- Tathagata Roy, is an Indian politician.
- Srideep Bhattacharya, is an Indian politician.
