= School of Architecture and Planning =

School of Architecture and Planning may refer to:

- Anna University School of Architecture and Planning
- Catholic University School of Architecture and Planning
- MIT School of Architecture and Planning
- University of the Witwatersrand School of Architecture & Planning

== See also ==
- School of Planning and Architecture (India)
- College of Architecture and Planning (disambiguation)
