= School of Planning and Architecture (India) =

Schools of Planning and Architecture are educational institutions run by the government of India under the jurisdiction of the Ministry of Human Resource Development. For the specific institutions, see:

- School of Planning and Architecture, Bhopal
- School of Planning and Architecture, Delhi
- School of Planning and Architecture, Vijayawada
