= Bhavna Chauhan =

Indian novelist, architect and former Indian Army major

Bhavna Chauhan (writer)
- Born: Pune, India
- Education: School of Planning and Architecture

Bhavna Chauhan is an Indian novelist, architect and a former Indian Army major. Chauhan graduated from the Officers Training Academy (OTA) in Chennai, India, in March 2001, standing first in the order of merit and winning six proficiency medals. She served as a Major in the Indian army for six years. Her first novel, Where Girls Dare, was published by Penguin Books in 2010 as part of their Metro Reads series. Where Girls Dare is a fictional account that follows the antics of 52 lady cadets (LCs), who train alongside 400 gentleman cadets (GCs), some of whom believe that having women in the armed forces is a bad idea.

Born in Pune, India, Bhavna Chauhan graduated from the School of Planning and Architecture in New Delhi. Chauhan currently lives in Roorkee with her Army engineer husband and son.
