= School of Planning and Architecture, New Delhi =

Architecture school in Delhi, India

Coordinates: 28°37′43.1″N 77°14′45.2″E

- Other name: SPA
- Former names: Department of Architecture, Delhi Polytechnic (1941–1959)
- Type: Public, Institutes of National Importance
- Established: 1941; 85 years ago
- Affiliations: National Association of Students of Architecture, NOSPlan
- Chairperson: Habeeb Khan
- Director: Dr. Virendra Kumar Paul
- Students: ~1,200
- Location: Delhi, 110002, India
- Website: www.spa.ac.in

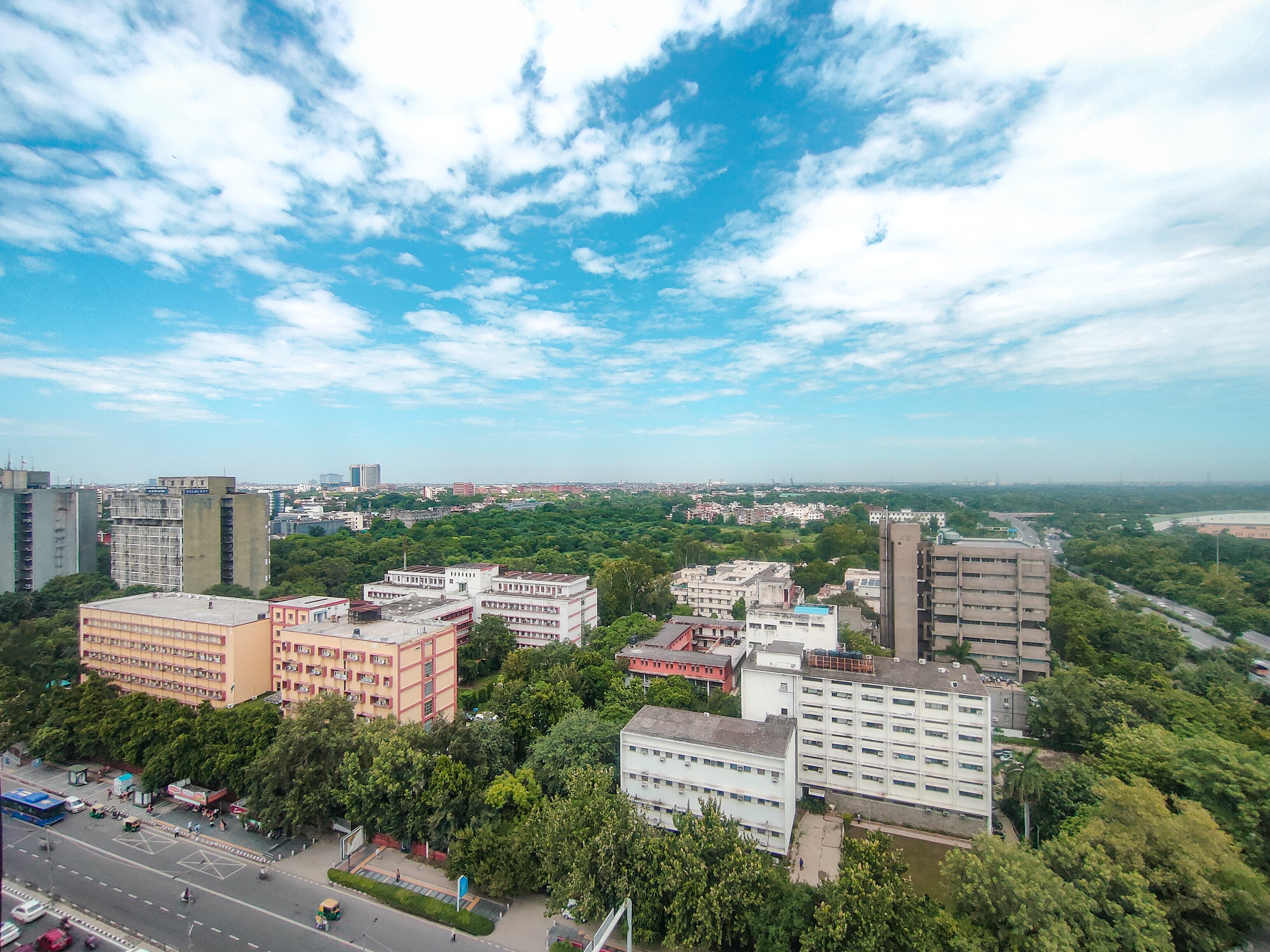
Aerial view of the Planning Block of the School

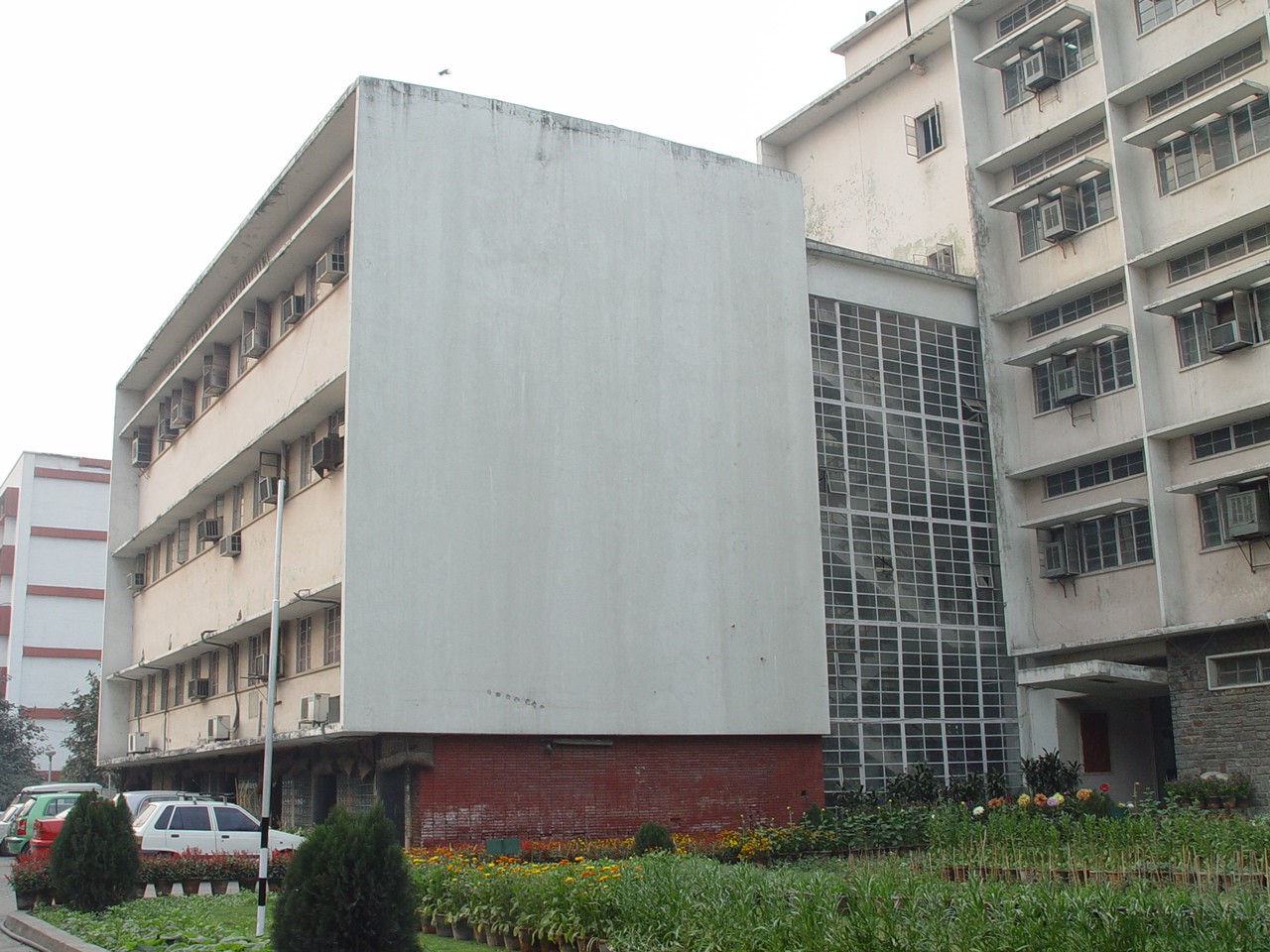
Planning block of School of Planning and Architecture, Delhi.

School of Planning and Architecture Delhi (SPA Delhi) is an Institute of National Importance located in Delhi, India, specialising in education and research in the fields of planning and architecture. The institute offers undergraduate, postgraduate and doctoral programmes in architecture, planning and design disciplines.

SPA Delhi is one of the three Schools of Planning and Architecture in India, along with SPA Bhopal and SPA Vijayawada, established by the Government of India to promote education in architecture and physical planning.

SPA Delhi functions as an autonomous institution under the Ministry of Education, Government of India. The institute has its own Board of Governors responsible for its administration and policy decisions.

== History ==
The beginning of the School of Planning and Architecture Delhi dates back to the year 1941, as a Department of Architecture of the Delhi Polytechnic of Delhi University (now Delhi Technological University). In 1942, Walter Sykes George and his associates established the Department of Architecture as part of the Delhi Polytechnic in Kashmere Gate. It was the first school for architects to be established in North India. 1959 it was merged with the School of Town and Country Planning (established in 1955 by the Government of India), renamed to its current name and affiliated to the University of Delhi. In 1979, recognising its national and international eminence, the institute was granted Deemed University status. In 2008, Government of India established two more SPAs, namely SPA Bhopal and SPA Vijaywada. In 2014, Lok Sabha passed a bill to make all the three SPAs "centre of excellence" on the pattern of IITs and IIMs. It was named an "Institution of National Importance" under the SPA Act 2014.

== Campus ==
The current SPA Delhi campus is split in two blocks one each for Planning and Architecture. Both these blocks are housed near ITO in Indraprastha Estate in Delhi. The girls hostel is located in the ITO campus itself and the boys hostel and residential campus is located in New Friends Colony, Maharani Bagh, Delhi.

As of July 2013 the final plans for the new campus in Vasant Kunj has been finalised.

== Organisation and administration ==
=== Governance ===
The Director of the School is assisted by 5 Deans as follows:

- Dean - Academics
- Dean - Research
- Dean - Student Affairs
- Dean - Faculty Welfare
- Dean - Planning and Development

Each department of studies has a Departmental Research Committee and Head of the Department of Studies is its chairperson. Academic policy is decentralised to the extent that each department of studies has an Advisory Committee, which makes proposals on department related academic matters. Chairperson of the Board of Studies is Head of the Department.

=== Departments ===
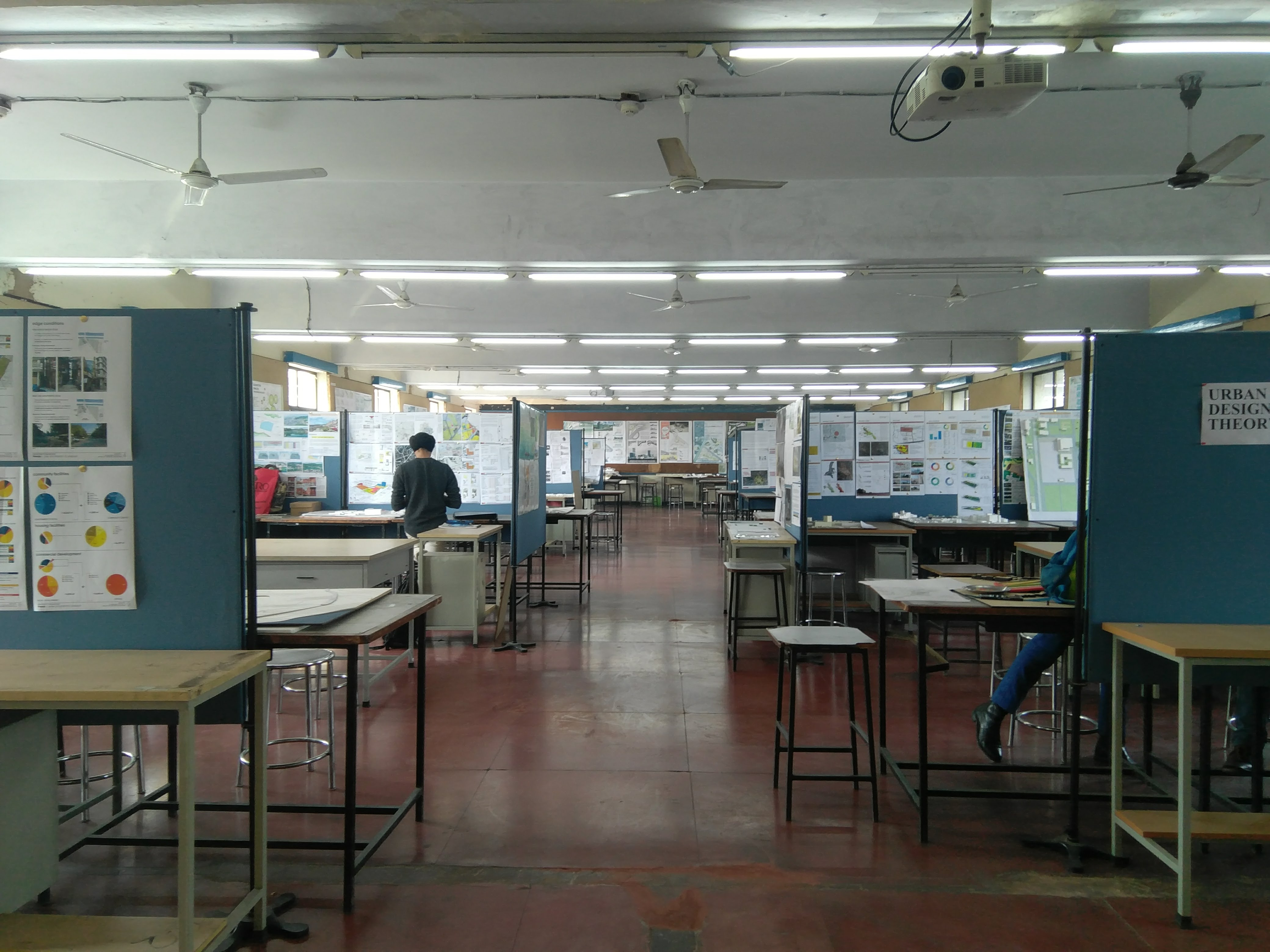
B.Arch Studio Classroom

The various Departments in the School are as follows:

- Department of Architecture
- Department of Urban Planning
- Department of Housing
- Department of Transport Planning
- Department of Landscape Architecture
- Department of Urban Design
- Department of Environmental Planning
- Department of Physical Planning
- Department of Regional Planning
- Department of Architectural Conservation
- Department of Industrial Design
- Department of Building Engineering and Management

== Academics ==
=== Academic programmes ===
The School offers planning, architecture and design courses both at undergraduate and postgraduate levels. Admission to undergraduate programs in all SPAs is tied to the Entrance Examination, popularly known as JEE. Candidates who qualify admission via Joint Entrance Examination can apply for admission in B.Arch. (Bachelor of Architecture) and B.Plan. (Bachelor of Planning) courses in SPAs. Admission to most postgraduate courses in SPAs is granted through various interviews and Graduate Aptitude Test in Engineering.

While the Bachelor of Architecture course is one of the oldest in the country, highly successful Bachelor of Planning course was started in 1989. Besides, the school offers 10 postgraduate programmes along with the doctoral programmes run by all the departments of studies. Total strength of the students in session 2015-2016 was 1,189 of which 717 were undergraduate students and 428 were post graduates. Presently 44 students are pursuing Ph.D. programme in the School.

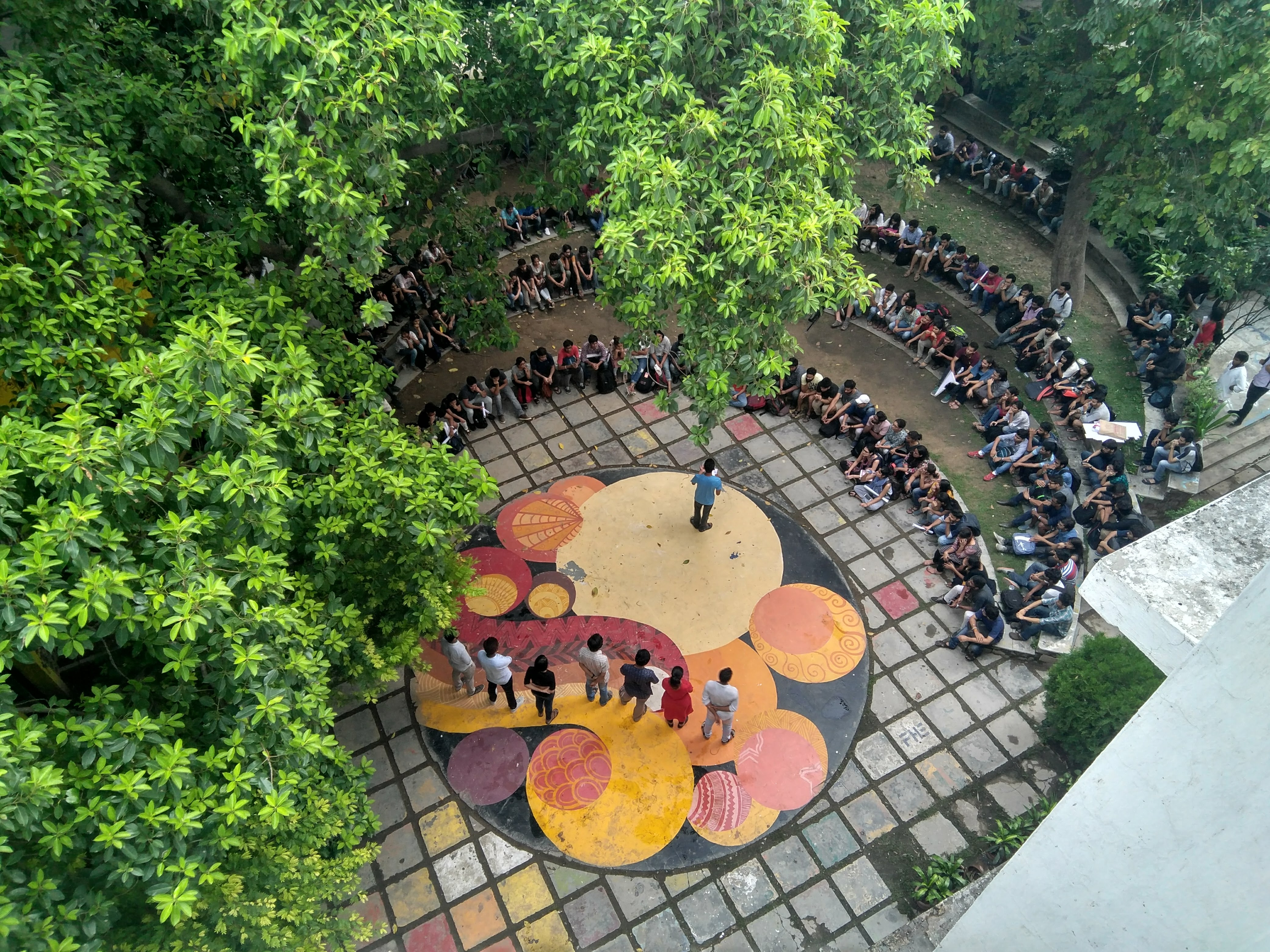
Open Amphitheatre at Architecture Block

=== Recognition ===
SPA Delhi has a special status as an "Institutes of National Importance" under an act of Parliament, due to which the degrees provided by SPA need not be recognised by the AICTE. The JEE and GATE are important factors behind the success of SPA, as it enables the SPA to accept only a select group of meritorious students. This combination of success factors has led to the concept of the SPA Brand. Other factors that have contributed to the success of SPA are stringent faculty recruitment procedures and industry collaboration. The procedure for selection of faculty in SPA is stricter as compared to other colleges offering similar degrees.

=== Rankings ===
University rankings

Architecture – India
- NIRF (2024): 4

In 2024, SPA Delhi was ranked 4th in architecture by the National Institutional Ranking Framework.

== Student life ==
=== Halls of residence ===
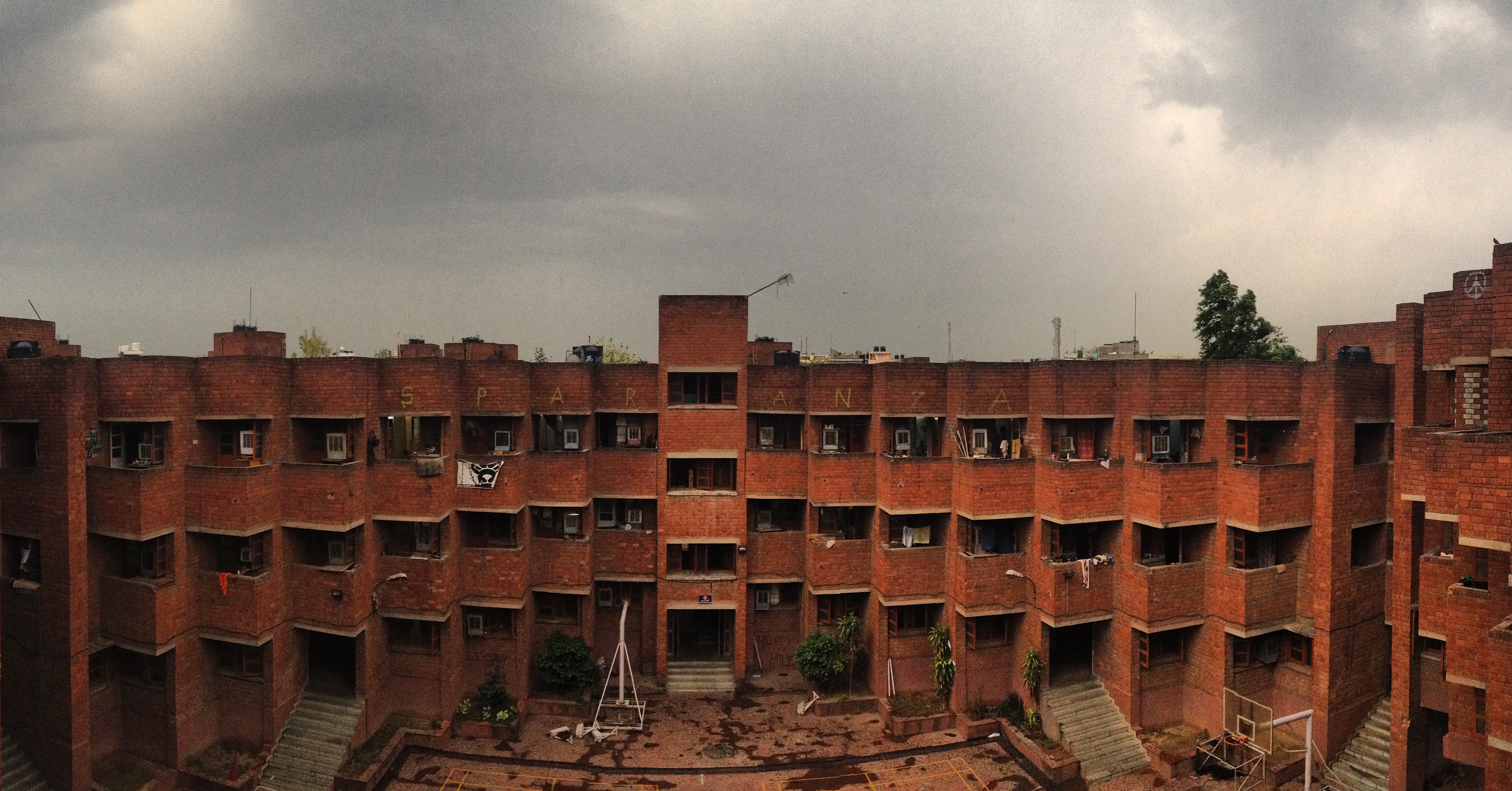
SPA Boys Hostel at Maharani Bagh Campus

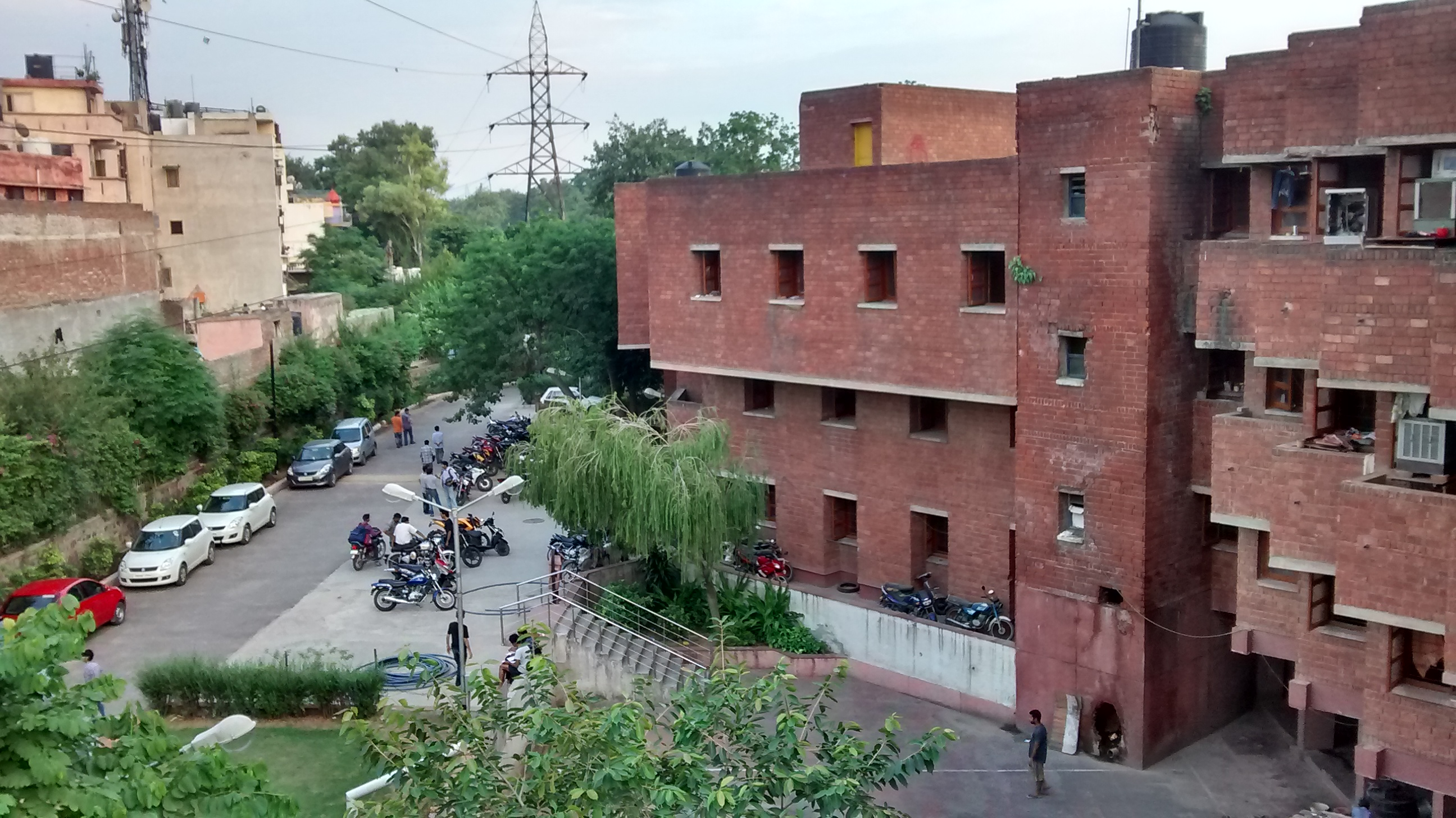
Entrance to the SPA Boys Wing

The SPA was one of the first institutions to have mixed hostels for girls and boys, but this was closed in 1993, despite student protests. There are two hostels for students. The planning block of the institution offers residence to girls. The hostel complex in Taimoor Nagar is designed for both boys and girls.

== Student Council ==
According to the Student Handbook the Council is organised in three tiers.

Tier	Core posts	Main responsibilities
Executive (General) Council	General President, General Secretaries (UG & PG), Editor	Represents the entire student body, coordinates with administration, issues official statements, and oversees joint Council initiatives.(spa.ac.in)
Undergraduate Council	UG President, UG Secretary, Cultural, Sports, Games & Photography Secretaries	Handles undergraduate welfare, cultural and sports events, first-year orientation and society coordination.(spa.ac.in)
Post-graduate Council	PG President, PG Secretary, Social & Entertainment Secretaries	Addresses PG academic concerns, research colloquia, professional-development workshops and community-outreach drives.(spa.ac.in)

=== Elections ===
Council elections are held once every academic year, generally at the start of the odd semester. All enrolled students vote by secret ballot; candidature is open department-wide and governed by election rules issued by the Dean (Student Affairs). The newly elected Council assumes office for a one-year term that runs parallel to the academic session.spa.ac.in

=== Activities ===
- Coordinates institute-wide festivals (freshers’ week, cultural & literary fests, sports meet) and annual orientation.
- Liaises with SPA Delhi societies and clubs, providing logistical support and funding.
- Represents students on statutory committees such as the Anti-Ragging Committee, Hostel Management Committee and academic forums

== Hostel Management Committee (HMC) ==
The Hostel Management Committee (HMC) is the statutory body that advises the School on all policy and operational matters connected with hostel accommodation, mess services and student welfare in the two campuses at ITO and Maharani Bagh. Chaired by the Honorary Hostel Warden and working in concert with the Dean (Student Affairs) and Estate Office, the HMC frames hostel rules, oversees maintenance budgets, vets mess contracts and represents resident students in decisions on allotment and discipline.

=== Elections ===
HMC elections are held once every academic year, generally at the start of the odd semester. All enrolled students vote by secret ballot; candidature is open department-wide and governed by election rules issued by the Dean (Student Affairs). The newly elected HMC assumes office for a one-year term that runs parallel to the academic session.spa.ac.in

=== Key functions ===
- Policy & Rules: Drafts and periodically revises hostel and mess regulations, forwarding recommendations to the Executive Council.
- Budget & Oversight: Monitors expenditure on maintenance, sanitation and security, and certifies monthly mess accounts.
- Grievance Redressal: Acts as the first forum for resolving issues related to accommodation, food quality and discipline before escalation to the Dean or Registrar.
- Events & Welfare: Coordinates with the Student Council on orientation of freshers, health-camp drives, energy-saving campaigns and hostel cultural nights.

Together with the Student Council, the HMC ensures that residential life at SPA Delhi remains safe, transparent and responsive to student needs, while adhering to the hostel rules laid down by the School. More information: https://spa.ac.in/resources/student-council

== Notable alumni ==
- Arundhati Roy, writer
- Baburam Bhattarai, 36th Prime Minister of Nepal
- Eugene Pandala, Indian architect known for building with Environmental Sustainability
- Gerard da Cunha, Indian architect of the famous Nrityagram
- Hisila Yami, former Minister of Physical Planning, Government of Nepal
- Raj Rewal, architect
- Revathi Kamath, pioneer of mud architecture in India

== In popular culture ==
- The movie In Which Annie Gives It Those Ones (1989) co-written by Arundhati Roy is based on the life of students of the college and was filmed at SPA.

== See also ==
- School of Planning and Architecture, Bhopal
- School of Planning and Architecture, Vijayawada
