= The Annual NASA Convention =

Annual NASA Convention
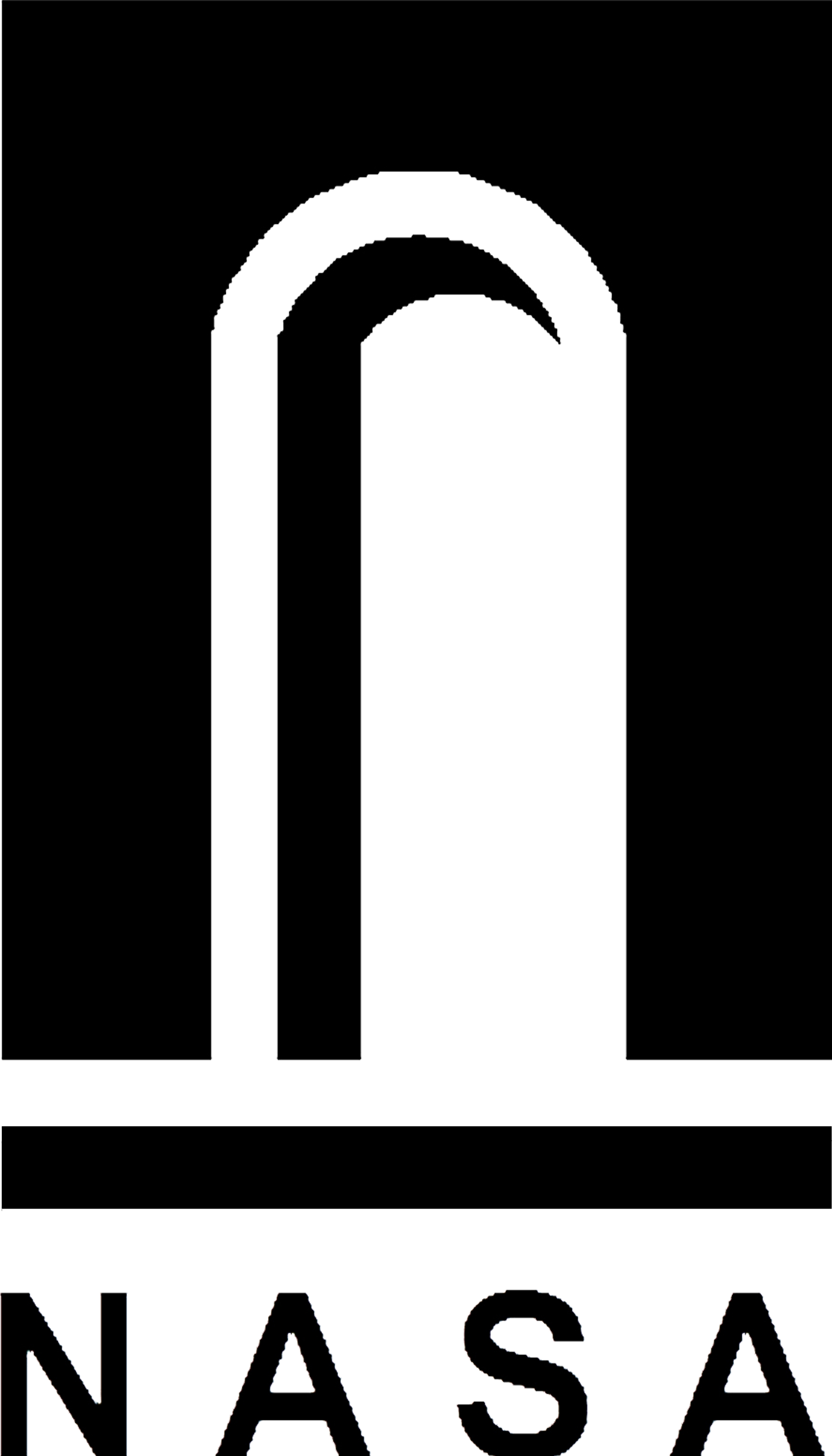
- Genre: Cultural
- Dates: January, Last weekend near
- Frequency: Annually
- Location: New Delhi, India
- Founded: 1957
- Attendance: 200 colleges
- Organizer: National Association of Students of Architecture
- Filing status: Student Run, Non-Profit Organization
- Website: https://nasaindia.co/

The Annual NASA Convention is the annual get together of National Association of Students of Architecture. It is a four-day-long event held towards the end of January and is attended by around 5,000 students. Called Annual NASA when it was started sixty years ago, the convention has gone on to become an integral part of all architecture colleges not only in India but as well as in the SAARC Nation. The Annual NASA Convention in 2016 was hosted by Gijubhai Chhaganbhai Patel Institute of Architecture (GCPIA), VNSGU, Surat from 1 to 5 February 2016. In the year 2023, this event has been hosted by Lovely Professional University from 9 to 12 June 2023.

== History of NASA ==
The National Association of Students of Architecture has been hosting an annual conventions for the past 66 years. The convention is awarded to a college by the Executive Council of the association to host it. Initially it was to happen every alternate year, when it was first hosted by JJ College of Architecture in 1957.

== Time ==
The ANC takes place during four days near the month of January or February. The event starts with an inauguration ceremony, which is then followed by the paneling of sheets, various lecture series, workshops and various such other formal and informal activities. last year it was 66th Annual NASA Convention which was hosted by EKC-Manjeri,Kerala

== Events and Workshops ==
The NASA Convention features more than one hundred events across a wide range of literary and cultural activities, accommodating both recreational participants and formal competitors.

=== Lectures and Performances ===
NASA Convention sees performances by many renowned artistes who come from around the world. It is also a platform where eminent personalities share their experiences or their take on a wide range of topics. Last edition of the Annual NASA saw lectures by eminent architect like BV Doshi, Christopher Charles Beninger and Fumihiko maki.

=== Competitions ===
The Annual NASA sees a variety of competitions in a wide range of fields like drawing, painting, elocution, quizzes and many more. People come from across the country to showcase their talents. Apart from these events NASA has its own set of trophies associated with some association for which the colleges compete.

== ISO 9001:2008 ==
NASA India, in a move to make address to the general complaints like a show starting late, poor remuneration for artists and inhospitable reception that plagues most of the nationwide cultural events in India, started collecting feedback from the participants over the years and started addressing these concerns. NASA India got ISO 9001:2008 certification in the year 2012.

== Organisation ==
NASA is a completely non-profit ,non governmental organisation managed entirely by the students from associated colleges of National Association of Students of Architecture. The organisational structure of NASA comprises the Executive Council,Zonal Council and the student representatives from each college's Unit Council. Together it's called the General Council. The Executive and Zonal council is elected from the General Council at the end of every annual convention.

== List of previous conventions ==
- 2025 (Tentatively in June)

67th Annual NASA Convention is to be hosted in Punjab.

- 2024 (29 Feb to 3 Mar 2024) 66th Year Annual NASA Convention was hosted by ERANAD KNOWLEDGE CITY, Manjeri Kerala (#Aaja Malabar)
- 2023 (June 9 to 12 June 2023) 65th Year Annual NASA Convention 2023 is hosted by Lovely Professional University, Punjab, India. Click the link to read the official release from LPU on this South Asia’s biggest Architectural Convention, NASA 2023
- 2022 (June) 64th Annual NASA convention, Christ University Benglore
- 2020 (Feb 7-10) 62nd Annual NASA convention, Innovative Film City, Benglore
- 2019 (Jan 18-Jan 23) 61st Annual NASA Convention SJBIT, Bangalore
- 2018 (Jan 29- Feb 2) 60th Annual NASA Convention DC School of Architecture and design, Vagamon, Idukki, Kerala
- 2017 (Jan 15-20) 59th Annual NASA Convention at Poornima University, Jaipur
- 2016 (Feb 1-5) 58th Annual NASA Convention at Gijubhai Chhaganbhai Patel Institute of Architecture (GCPIA), VNSGU, Surat
- 2015 57th Annual NASA Convention at Marg Institute of Design and Architecture Swarnabhoomi (MIDAS), Kancheepuram, Chennai (The evening started with a fantastic opening ceremony tracing the architecture and most successful)
- 2014 56th Annual NASA Convention (Contextual of Time, Space and People) was conducted by the Vaishnavi School of Architecture & Planning at Hitex, Hyderabad.
- 2013 (January) 55th Annual NASA Convention, held at Gateway College of Architecture.
- 2012 (Jan 27-30) 54th Annual NASA Convention, Ahmedabad.
- 2011 53rd Annual NASA Convention Utopia 10' held at BVBCET, Hubli.
- 2010 52rd Annual NASA Convention at SRM, Chennai.
- 2007 50th Annual NASA Convention in M.A.N.I.T Bhopal.
- 2006/2007 (January) 49th Annual NASA Convention at MIT Manipal
- 2005 ‘Pulse 2005’ The 48th Annual Convention of National Association of Students of Architecture (NASA), hosted by Academy of Architecture, Mumbai
- 2004 ‘Srijan ‘04’ The 47th Annual Convention of National Association of Students of Architecture (NASA), hosted by Madhav Institute of Technology & Science (MITS), Gwalior
- 2001 (Dec 26 to 29) 44th annual convention in Mumbai
- 1999 (December) “Sustainability and Architecture” 42nd Annual NASA Millennium Convention, Bangalore
- 1998 (Dec 22-25) 41 st NASA Convention XENOS '98 at the School of Architecture and Planning, Chennai
- 1997 (Dec 17-20) Vastutsav hosted by Rizvi College of Architecture, Mumbai. VASTUTSAV was held at the Andheri Sports Complex from Dec 17–20, 1997. The evening started with a fantastic opening ceremony tracing the architecture zeitgeist in India at the time and then culminating in a 45-minute rock show by Remo, a fellow architect and one of India's great artists.
- 1996 SPA Delhi
- 1995 VRCE Nagpur (now VNIT, Nagpur)
- 1987 30th Annual NASA Convention SAP, Anna University (Chennai). In one of the notable achievements of the association, the Indian Arch publication was first released here in this convention.
