= Eugene Pandala =

Indian architect (born 1954)

Eugene N. Pandala
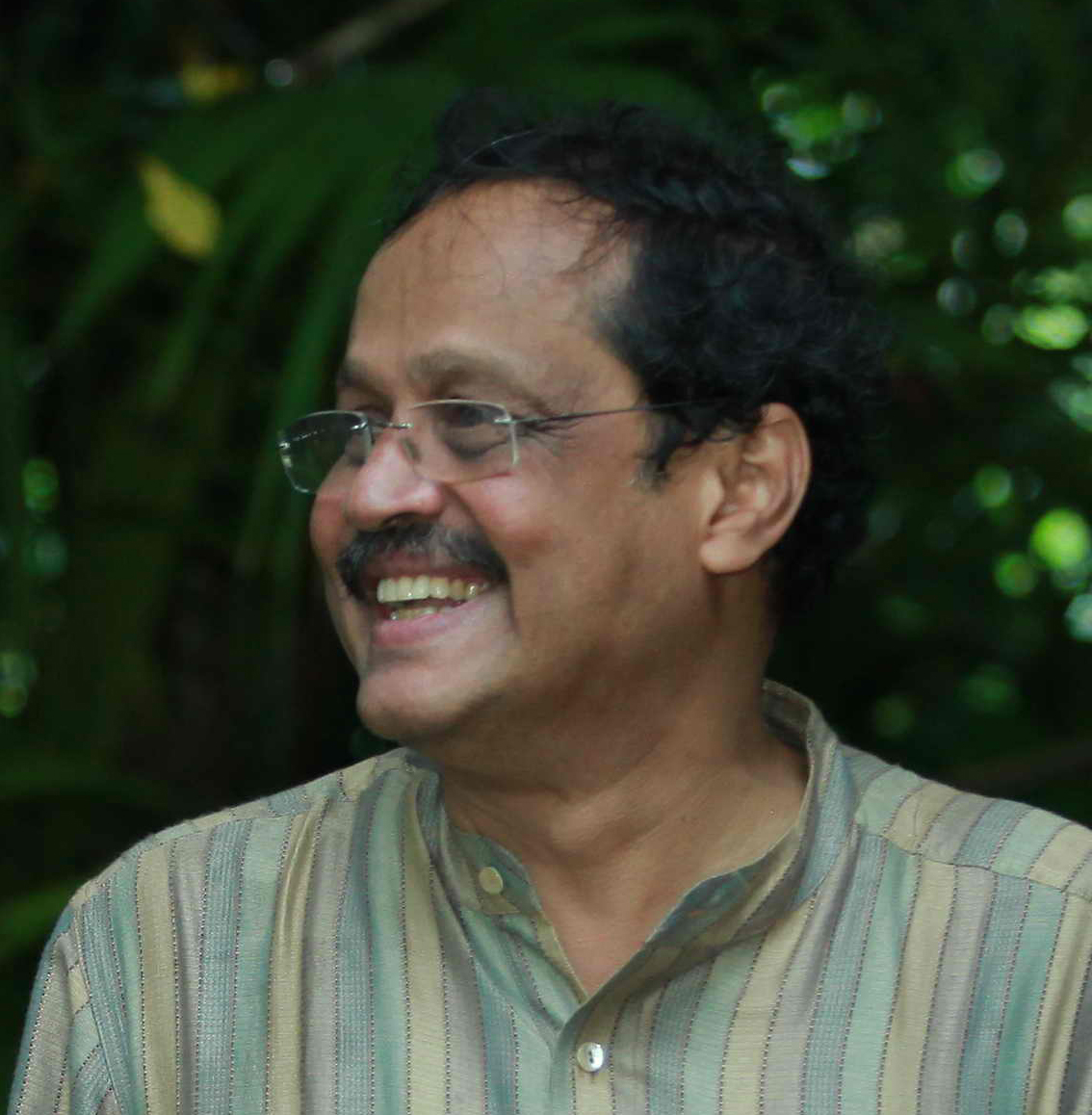
- Born: 19 March 1954 (age 72); Kollam, India
- Education: College of Engineering Trivandrum, School of Planning and Architecture, New Delhi
- Occupation: Architect
- Website: eugenepandala.com

Eugene Pandala is an Indian architect, known for building with values of environmental sustainability.

== Education and career ==
Pandala completed his Bachelor's in Architecture from College of Engineering Trivandrum. Pandala studied for a Masters in Urban Design at the School of Planning and Architecture, New Delhi. He had his Fellowship in Heritage Conservation at University of York and at Fort Brockhurst English Heritage Training Centre in the U.K. He was the founding head of the second school of Architecture in Kerala (1985) located at Kollam where he spent time educating and researching on traditional building technologies of India.

Pandala while studying at Delhi School of Planning and Architecture met the legendary architect Hassan Fathy, and was inspired to build with mud. As a nature lover, and cultural heritage conservation activist, he designs buildings with natural materials, landscapes with biodiversity conservation, and native vegetation, preferring interesting organic forms. Pandala built his first mud house in Kollam in 1996, comprising 2,500 sq. ft. of building, bringing him to the public's attention.

His unique Architecture style paved way to many awards, and recognition. In 2011, Lalit Kala Academy awarded him the first Laurie Baker award (The Hindu The Sunday, 30 January 2011). The Designer of the year Award given by Inside Outside design magazine in 2007 (Kerala artist retreat bags best eco-friendly design award Business Standard Sunday, 25 March 2012) was for eco friendly design. His heritage Conservation project in East Fort Trivandrum was chosen for a commendation award by Inside Outside magazine in 2004. In 1999 for one of his residential building built with mud "Bodhi", Pandala was given, a Commendation award, by J.K. Foundations, Architect of the year award.

Fort Cochin Heritage conservation project, Trivandrum East Fort Conservation projects, is often cited as good examples of Kerala heritage conservation initiatives. This was led by Eugene Pandala's conservation team enabling the State Government to win the PATA award. Sustainable architecture/Green buildings is a field where Pandala has excelled. His Tsunami rehabilitation project for Malayala Manorama and buildings for hospitality industries receives wide acclaim due to its interwoven complicity with nature.

He was a keynote speaker at the 361 degree conference 2016 held at Nehru centre in Mumbai.

In March 2016, British council hosted Pandala for their Great Talk Series in Mumbai and at Pune.

The need for Affordable Sustainable housing for the masses were debated in Shashwat - a publication of the green certification wing of Government of India. 'Griha'

== Notable projects ==
Earth resort, Banasura Hill Resort, Wayanad, Kerala - 20,000 sq ft, 31 room resort.

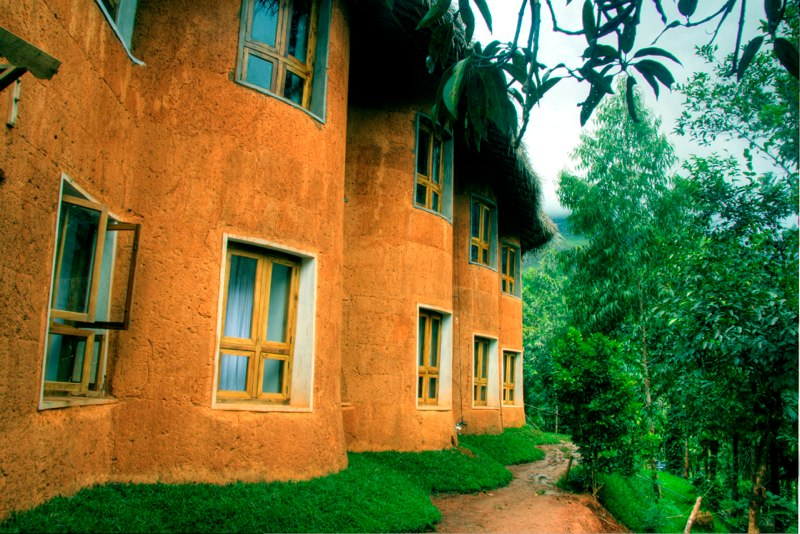

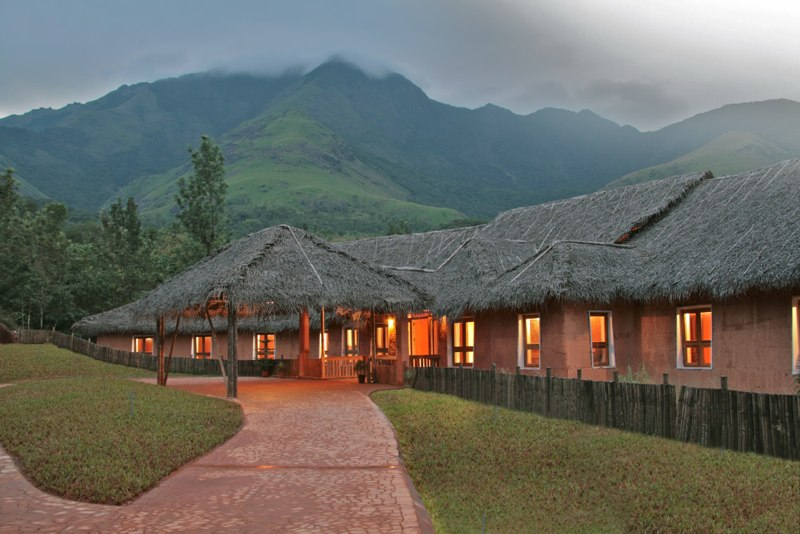

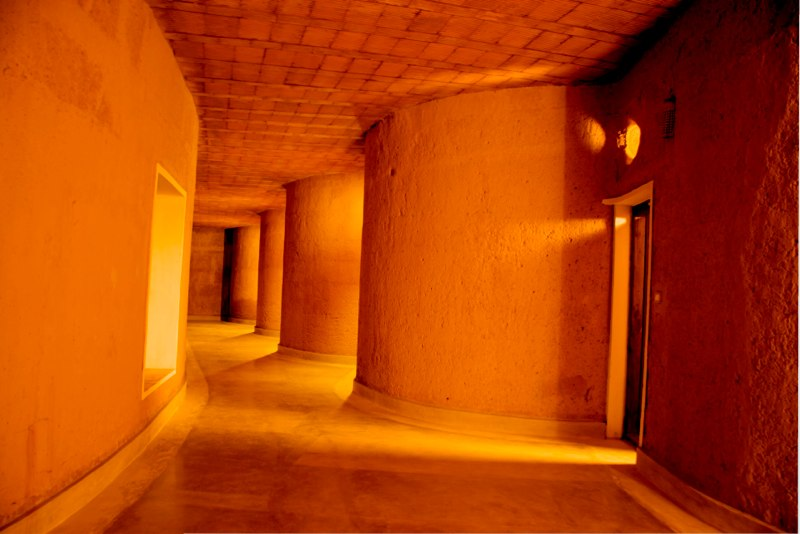

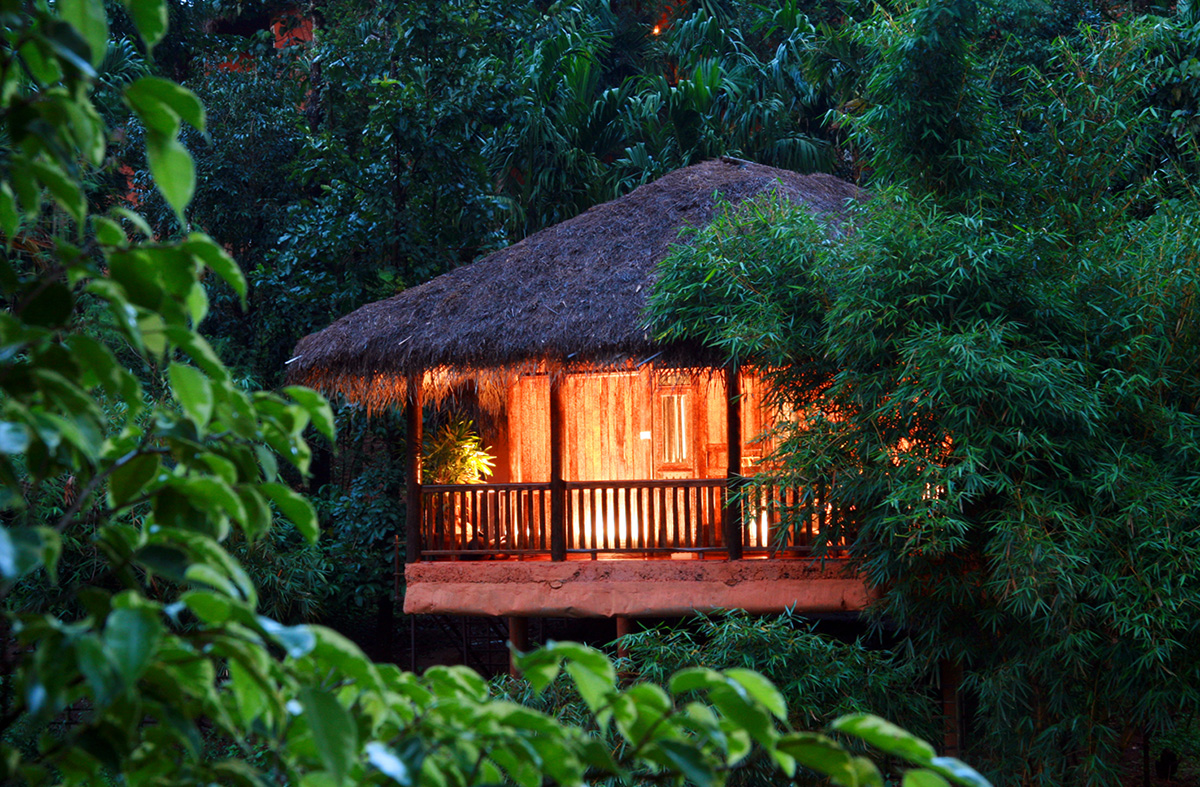

The Raviz, Kollam, Kerala - 94 room resort.

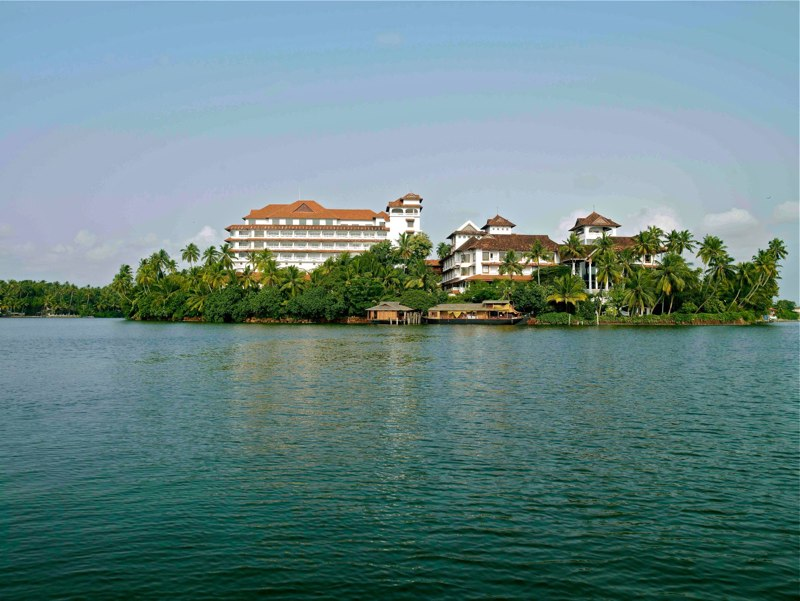

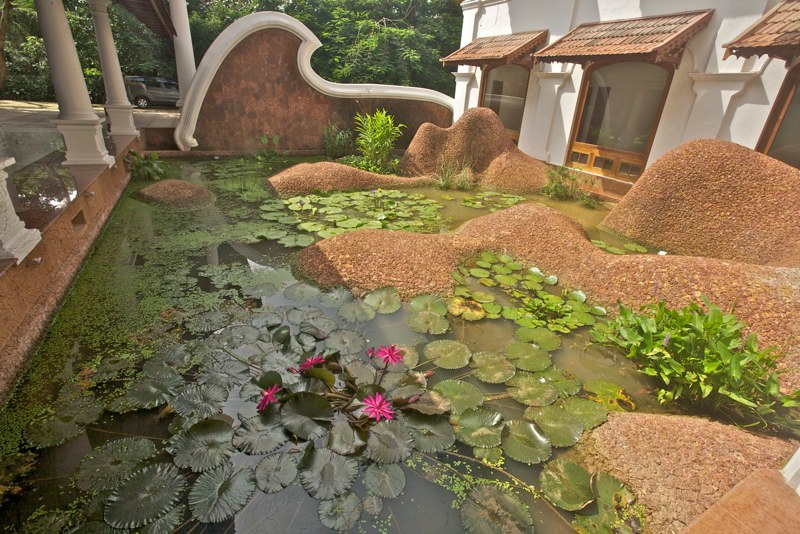

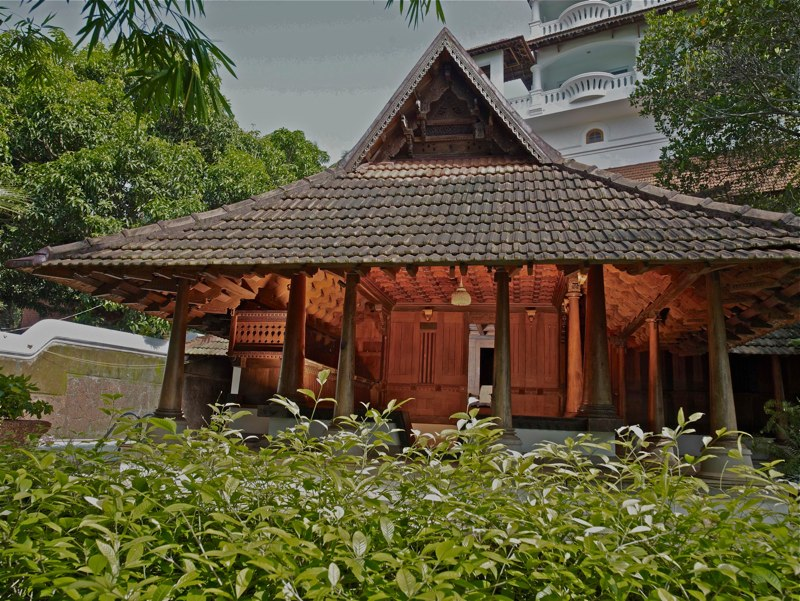

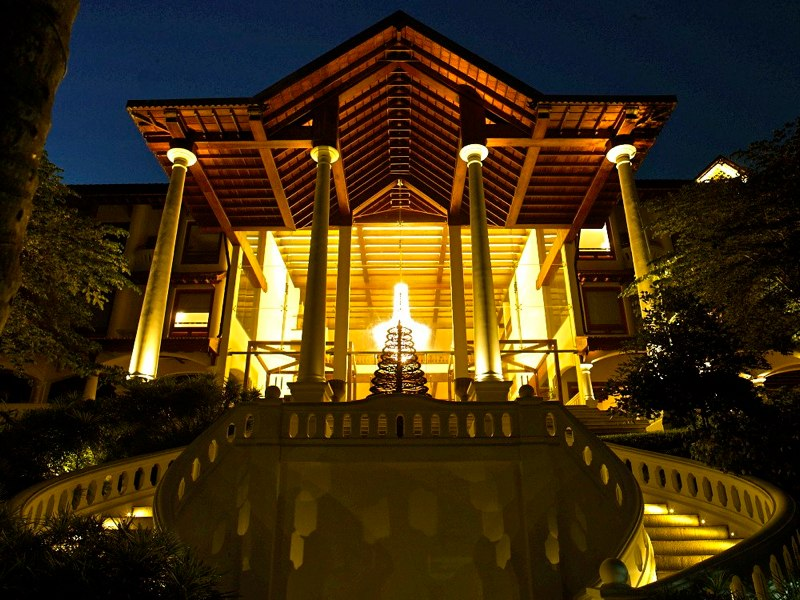

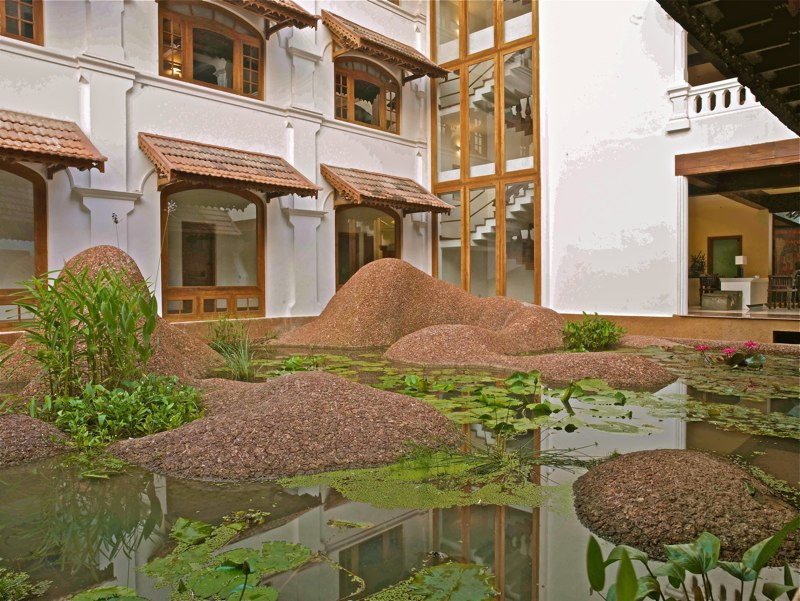

Revathy Kala Mandir, Trivandrum, Kerala - A Film Academy.

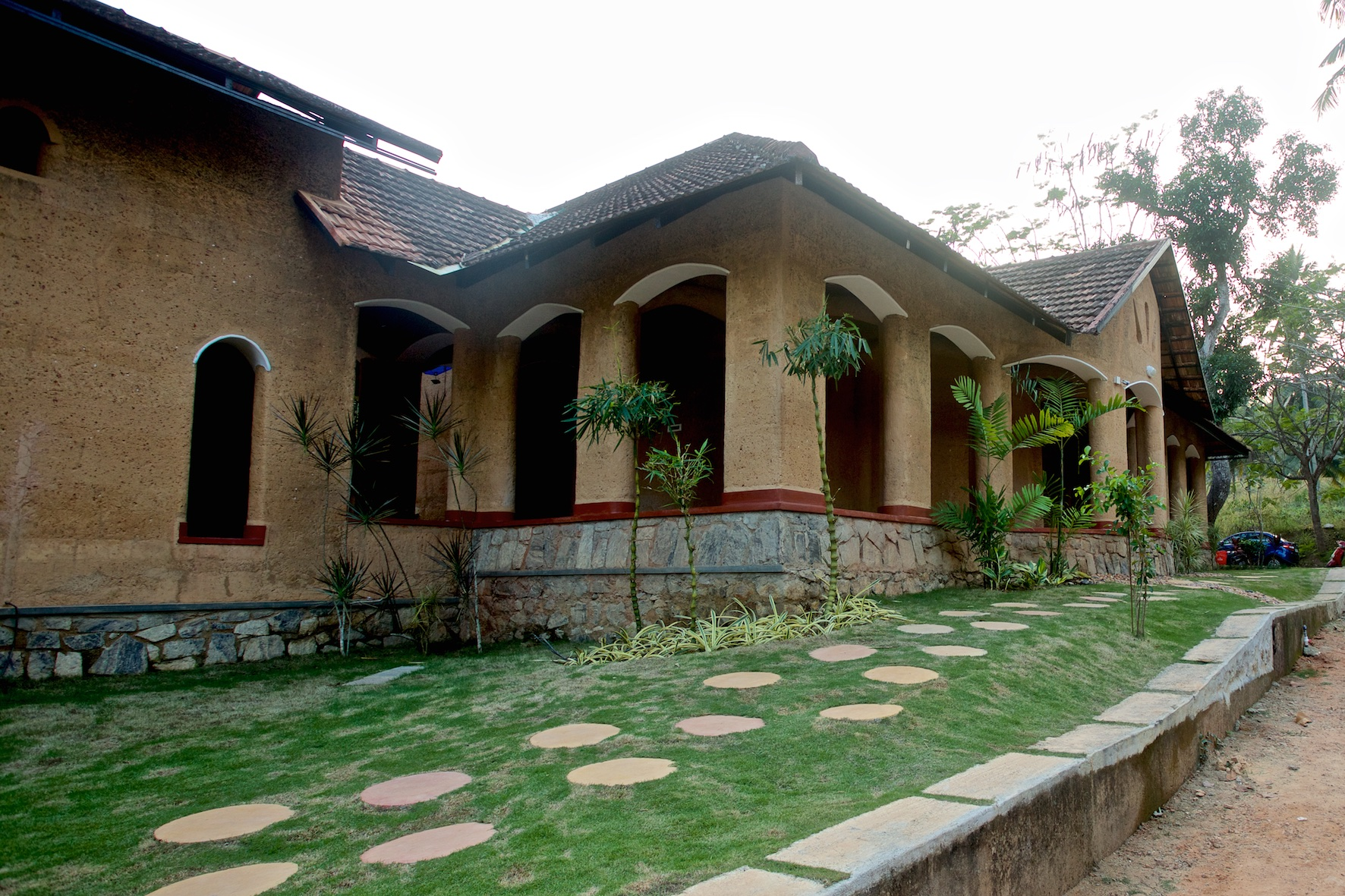

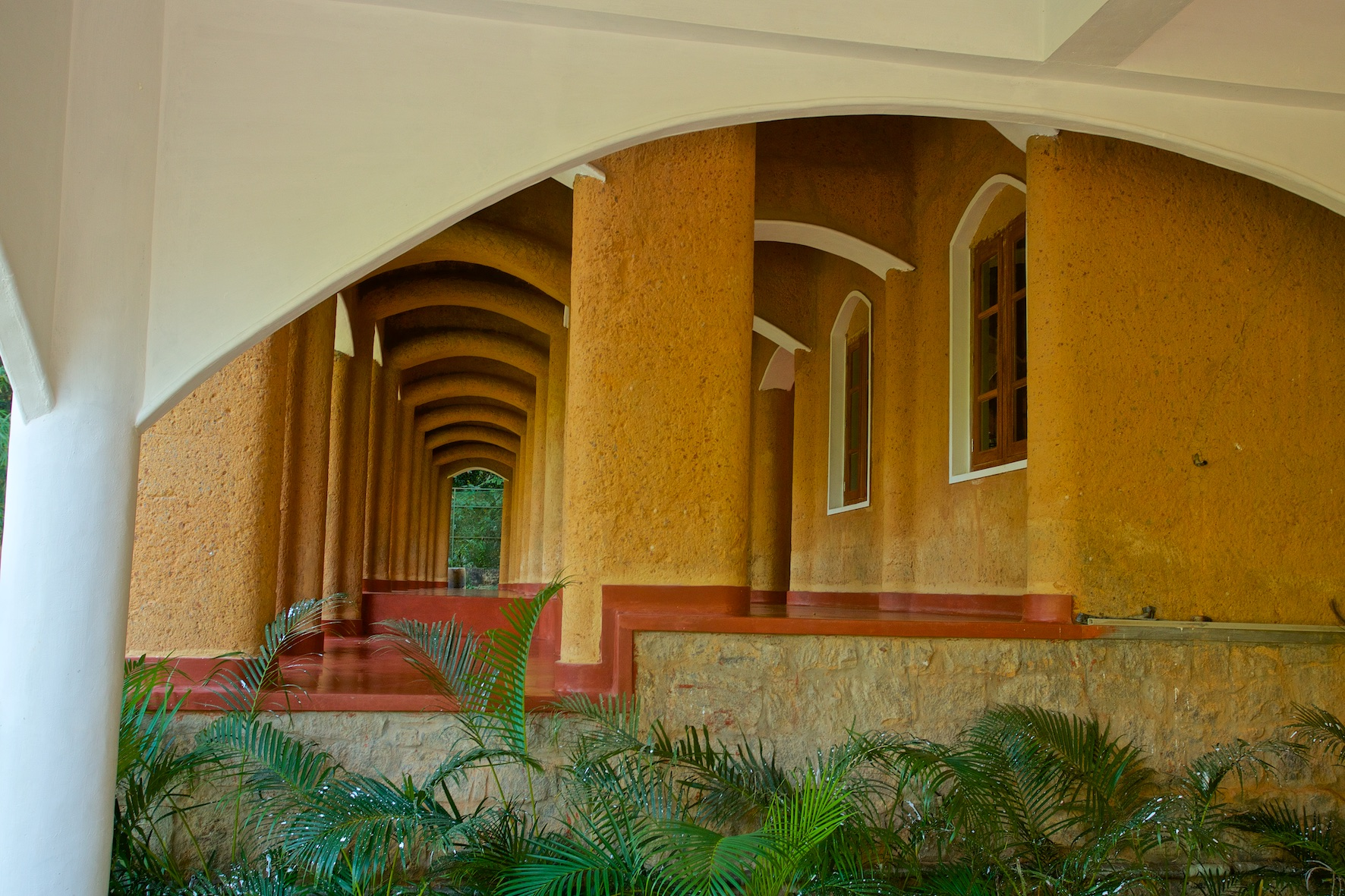

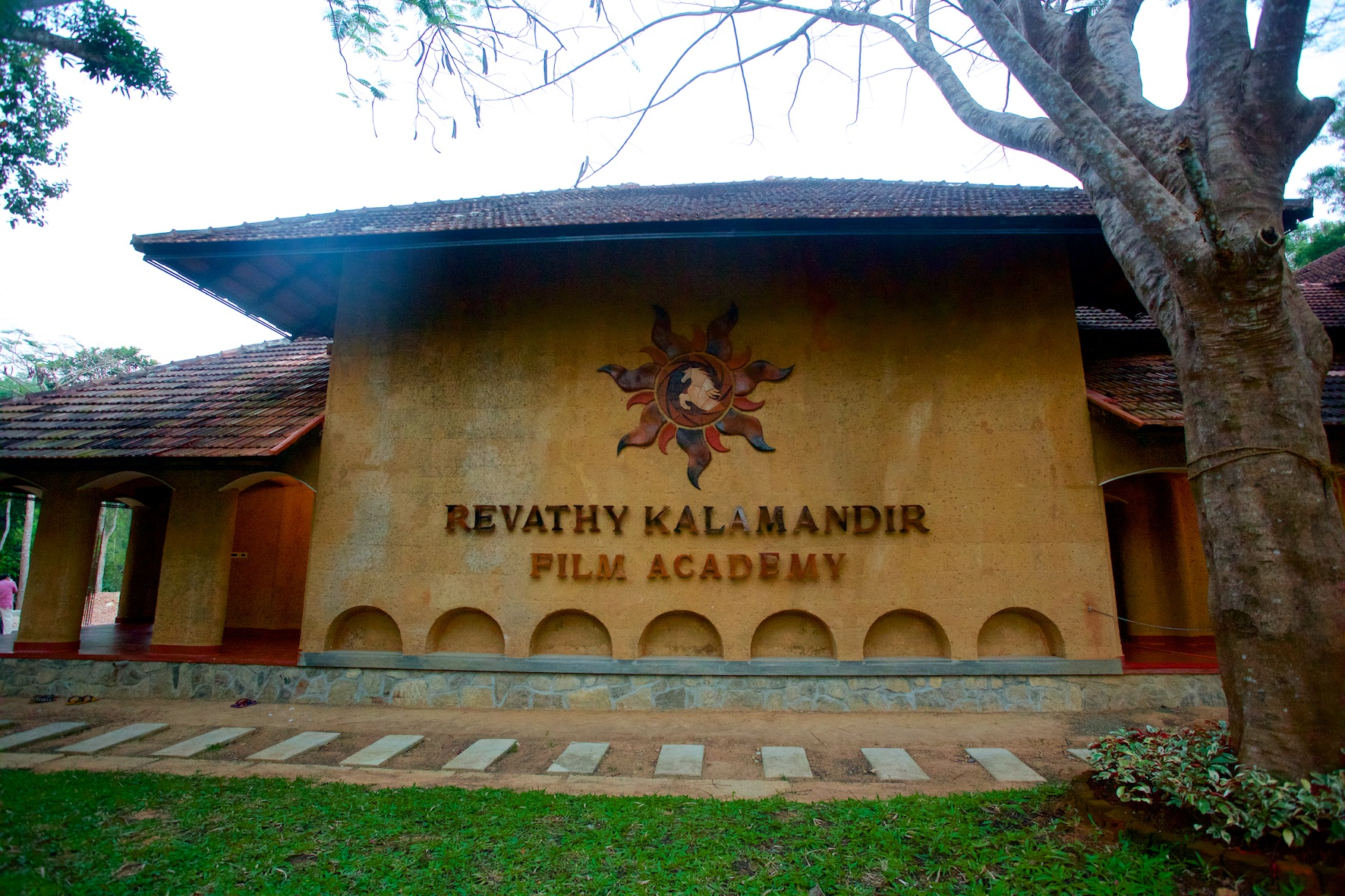

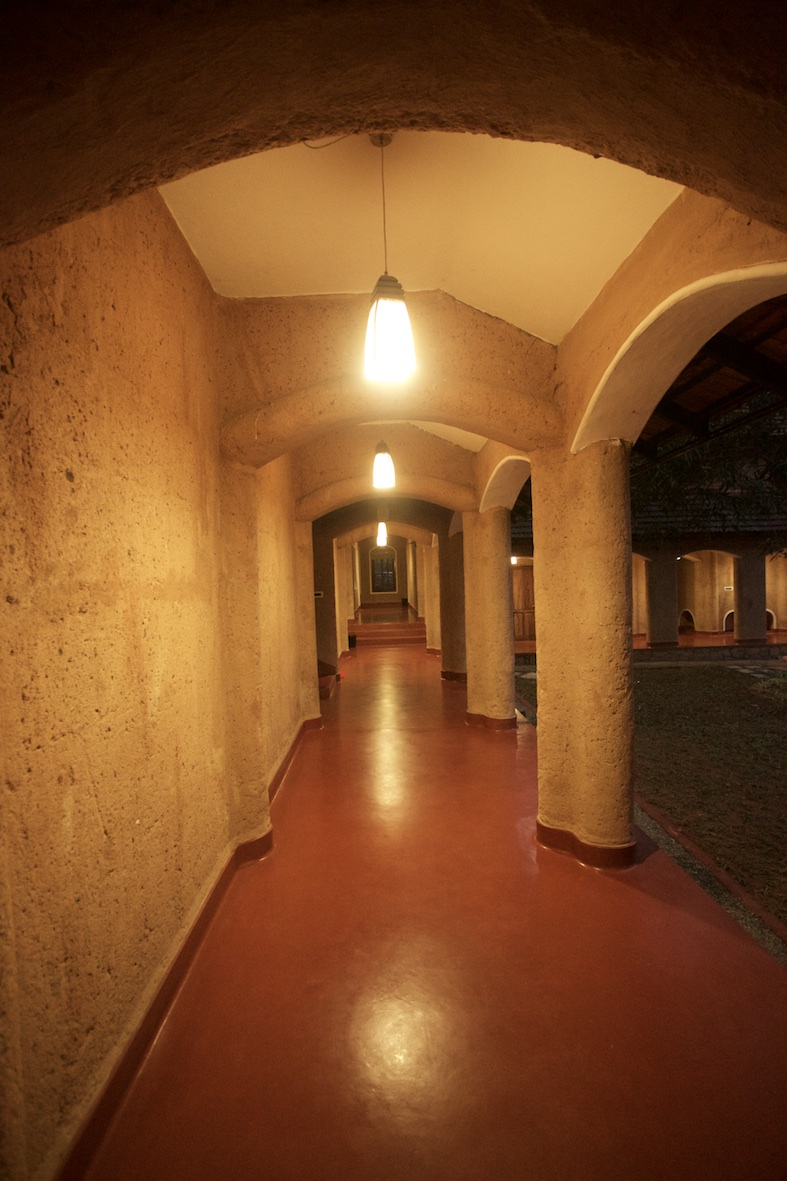

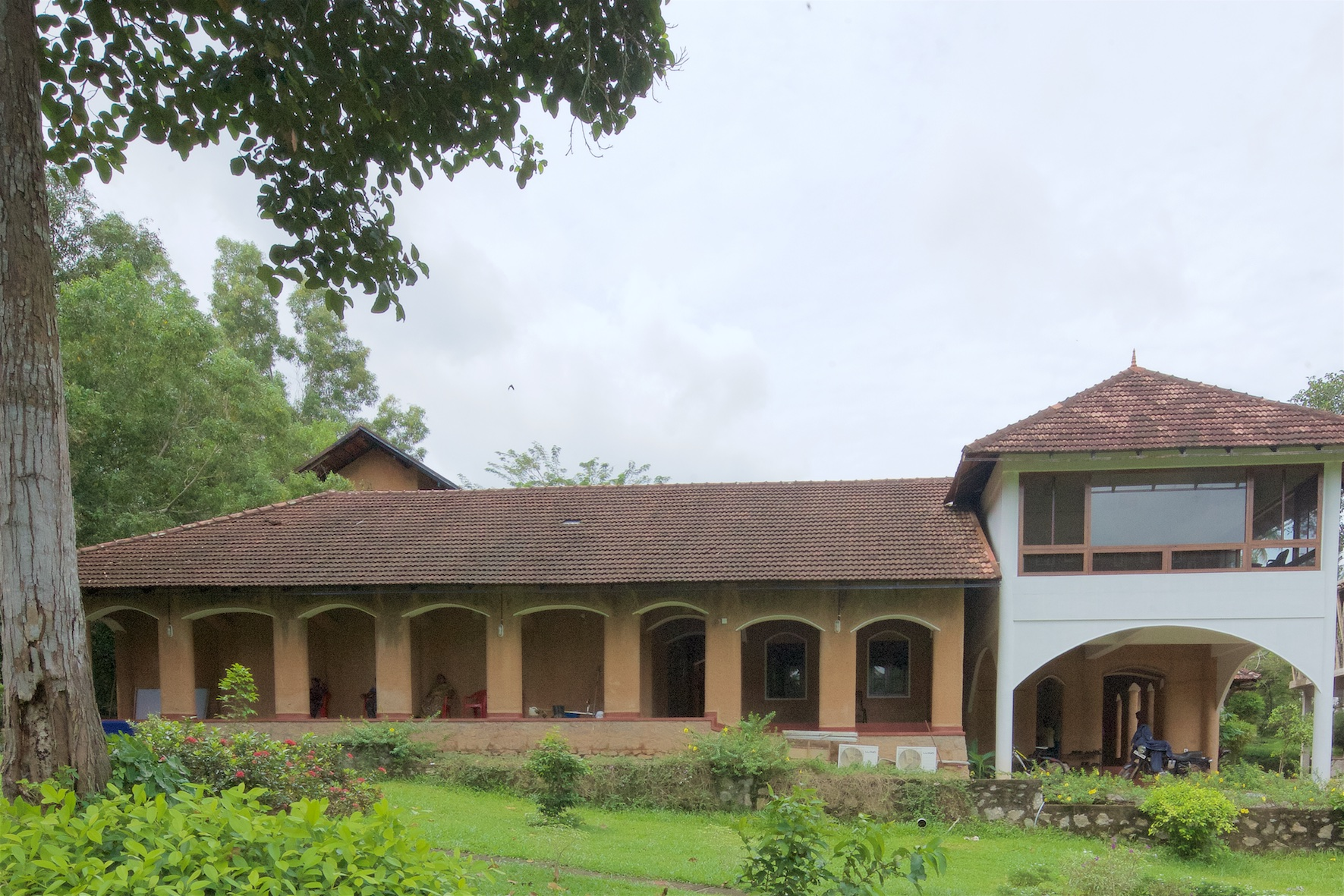

BODHI was built in 1996. This mud house is an example of sustainable architecture using natural materials and was extremely comfortable and environment friendly.

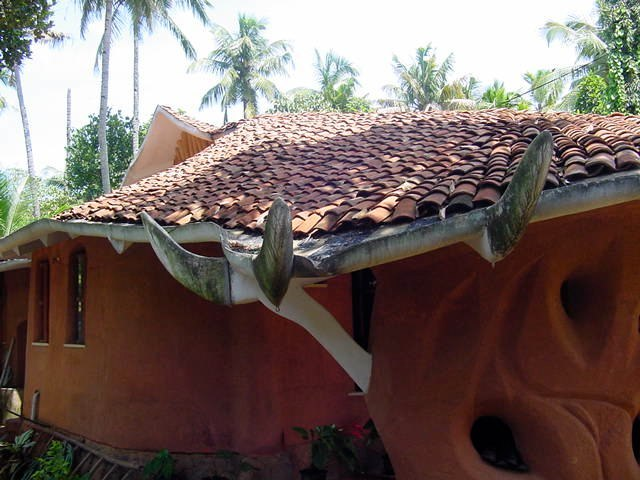

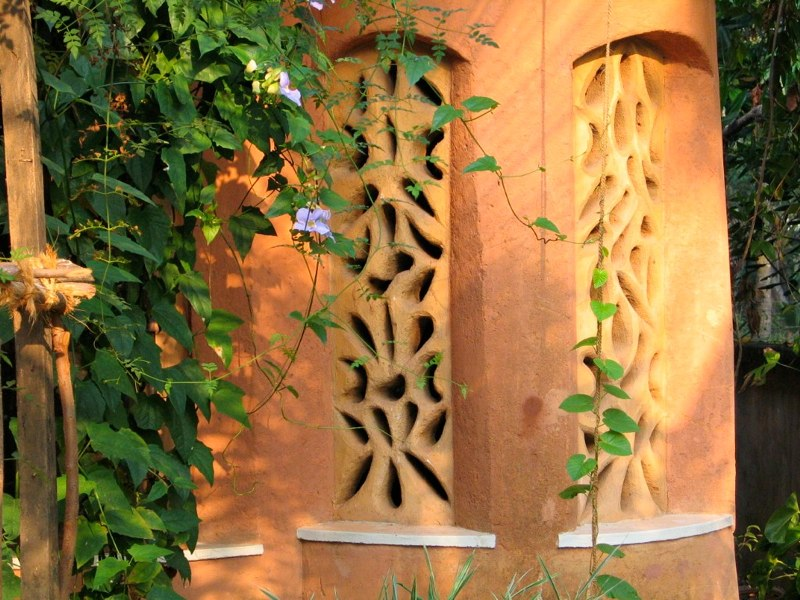

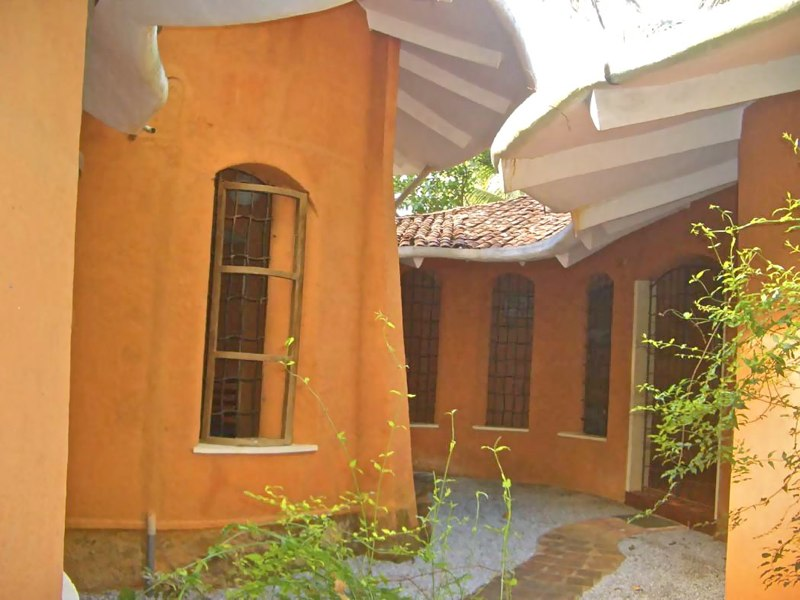

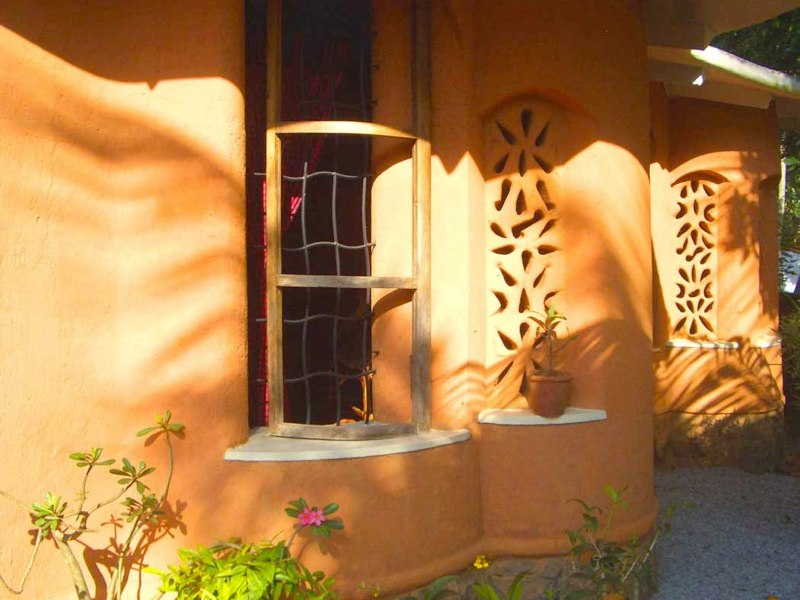

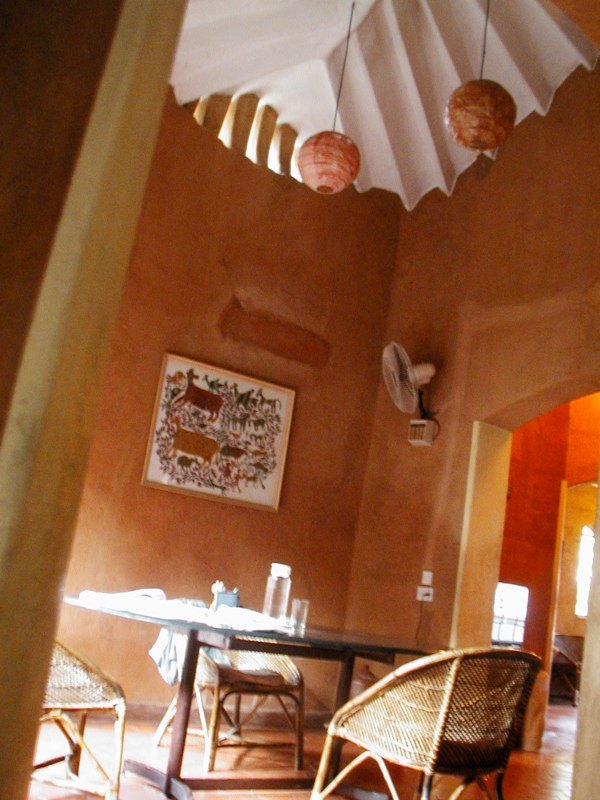

OWIYUM - A work and living space for Indian and German artists at Marayoor for keeping the built foot print as small as possible and not effecting the ecosystem strictly.

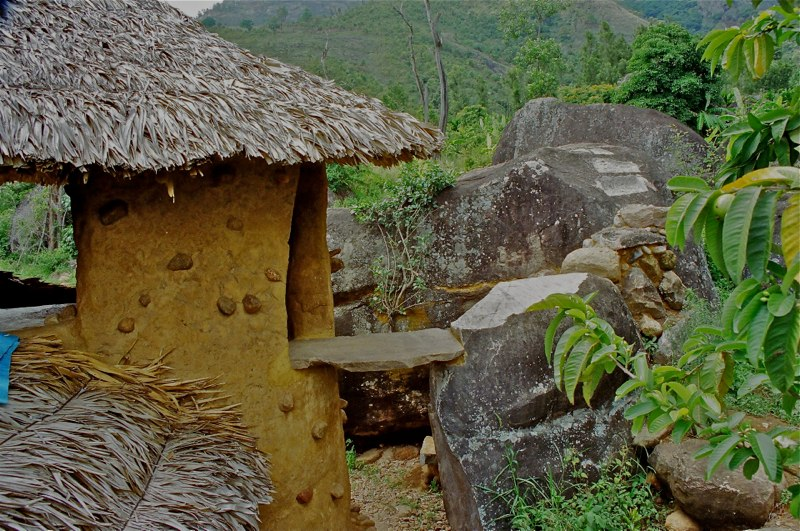

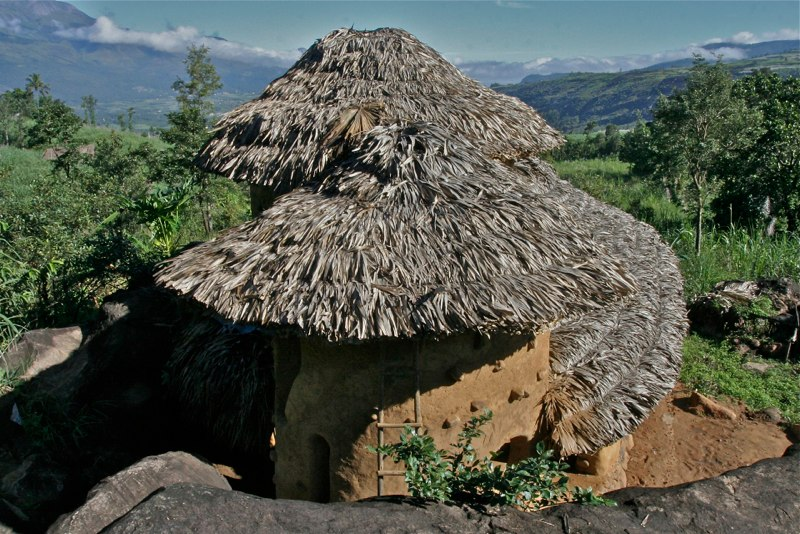

Pazasi Raja's Tomb – a tribute to the great king of the bygone era of Kerala.

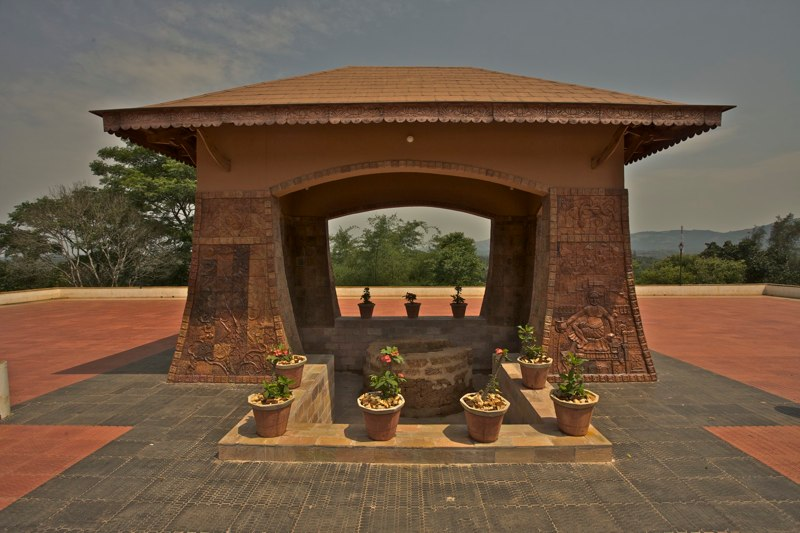

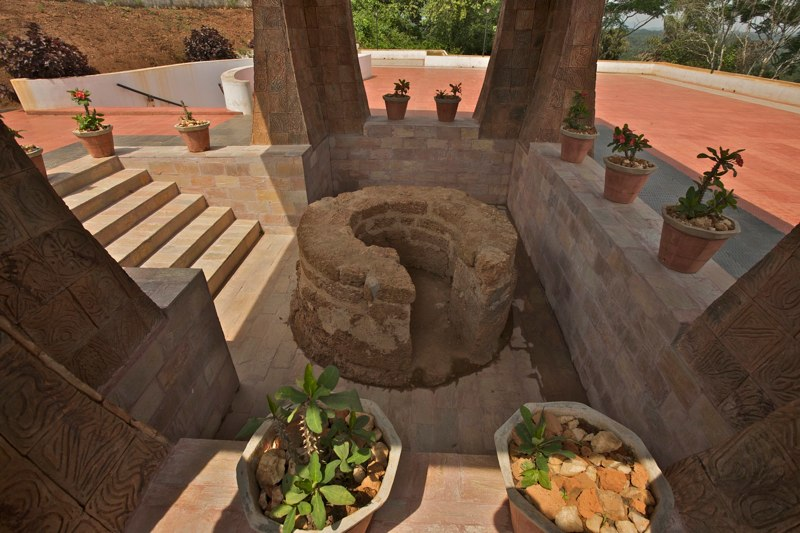

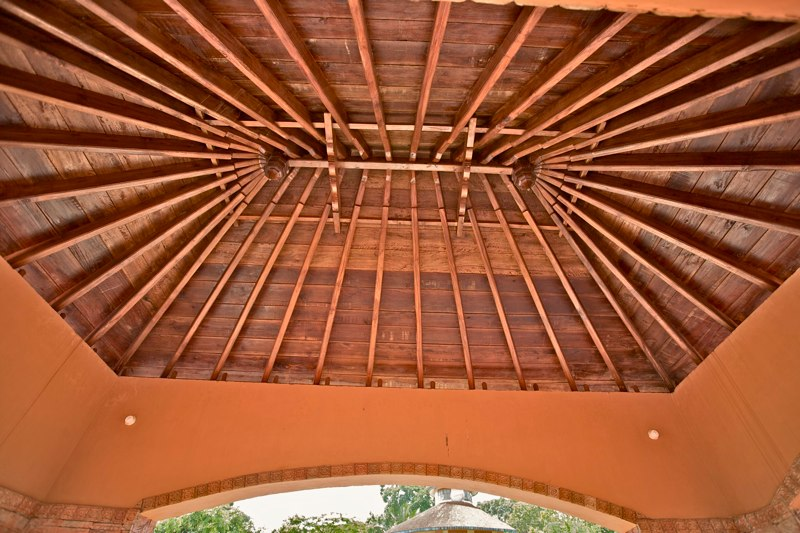

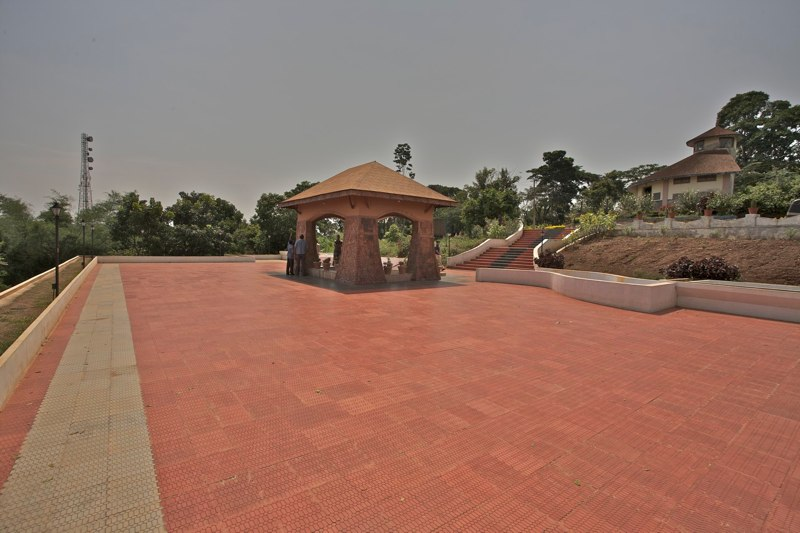

Sarai at Toria, Madhya Pradesh. A uniquely designed accommodation is situated on a riverside site, near Khajuraho in Madhya Pradesh, India.

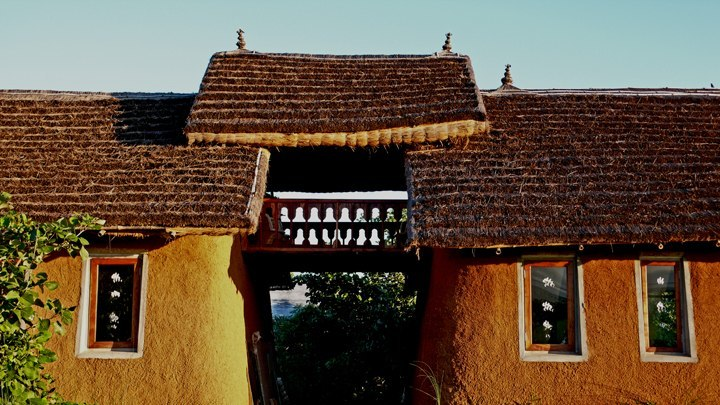

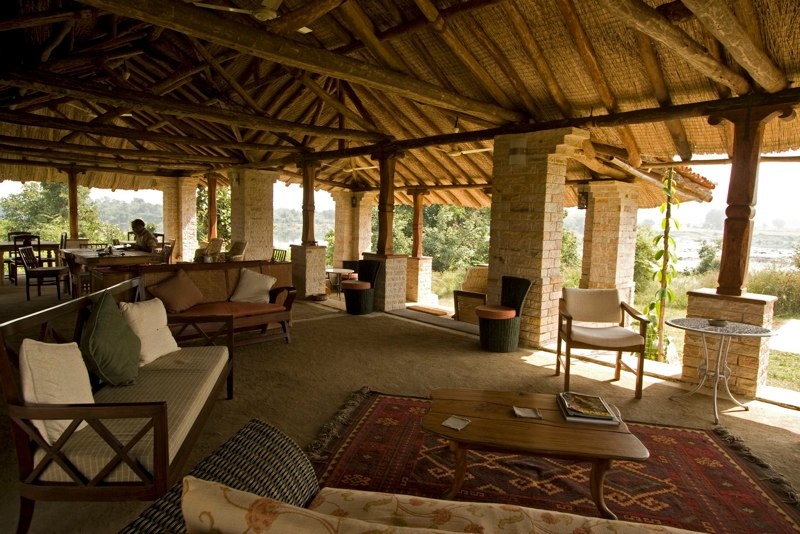

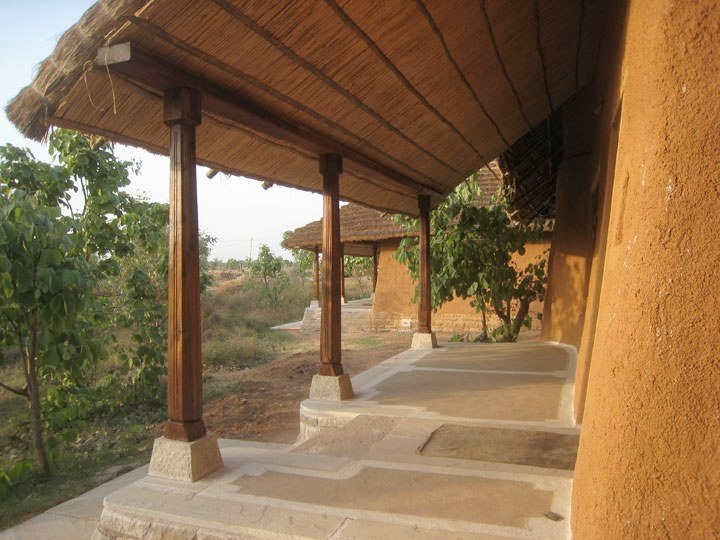

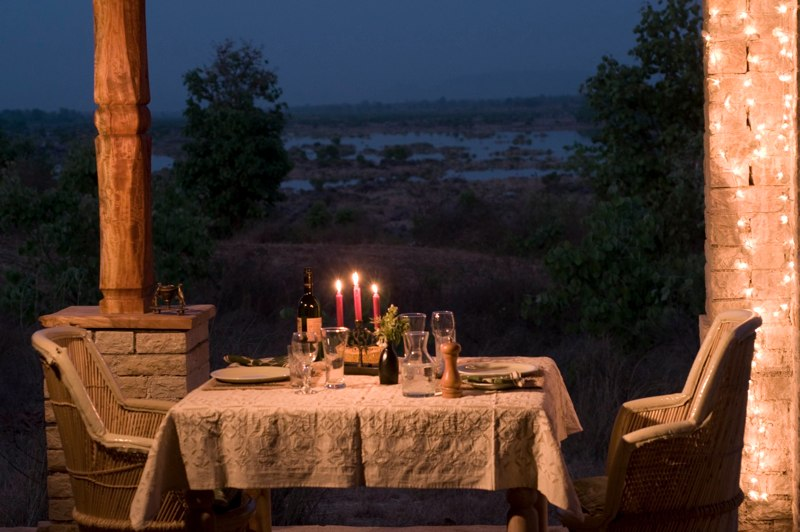
