= School of Planning and Architecture, Vijayawada =

Architecture school in Vijayawada, India

- Type: Autonomous
- Established: 7 July 2008; 18 years ago
- Affiliations: NASA; NOSPlan
- Academic affiliations: Institute of National Importance
- Chairperson: Ar. (Dr.) Amogh Kumar Gupta
- Director: Dr. Ramesh Srikonda
- Faculty: 42 full-time
- Students: 596
- Location: Vijayawada, Andhra Pradesh, India
- Campus: 7.2 acres (2.9 ha); Suburban, 2.66 acres (1.08 ha) Urban, 9.66 acres (3.91 ha)
- Colors: Earthen Yellow and White
- Website: www.spav.ac.in

The School of Planning and Architecture, Vijayawada (SPA Vijayawada) is a higher education institute in Vijayawada, India, specializing in education and research in the field of urban planning and architecture. It is one of the three School of Planning and Architecture (SPAs) established by the Ministry of Human Resource Development, Government of India (now Ministry of Education) in 2008 as an autonomous institute and a fully Centrally Funded Technical Institution (CFTI). It forms part of the league along with the other two SPAs: SPA Bhopal and SPA Delhi.

== History ==
The roots of the institute are with a report made by the Institute of Town Planners, India (ITPI), on the request of the Ministry of Education (India) regarding the establishment of more SPAs, in addition to the SPA Delhi, established in 1959. Based on this report, the decision was made to establish two schools, in Bhopal and Vijayawada. On 7 July 2008, SPA Vijayawada was established as an autonomous Centrally Funded Technical Institution (CFTI). In 2014, Lok Sabha passed a bill to make all the three SPAs "centre of excellence" on the pattern of IITs and IIMs, now it is a Institute of national importance.

== Campus ==
Initially, the school was operated out of a temporary campus in Acharya Nagarjuna University in Guntur till 2011, before moving to its current campus. In 2011, the foundation stone of the Vijayawada campus was laid by Daggubati Purandeswari, Minister of State for Human Resource Development. The present campus is located at Nidamanuru, on National Highway 5, close to the Vijayawada Airport (12.4 km only). Expansion plans include building more hostels to accommodate the growing number of post graduate students, a state-of-the-art sports complex and residential quarters for doctoral students.

The Government of Andhra Pradesh is in the process of allotting nearly 60 acres of land, spread over two locations in and around Vijayawada, for the development of the school. Of this, the first 7.2 acres was handed over on 22 February 2010. In January 2012, design for the new campus was adopted as part of an all-India competition and it is proposed to develop it as an eco-friendly campus with state-of-the-art facilities. The proposed campus will comprise academic, co-curricular and residential facilities.

== Governance ==
The school is being run under the supervision and guidance of a board of governors. The board comprises members from Ministry of Education (India), Department of Higher Education, Andhra Pradesh Government, two representatives of the Government of India from the fields of architecture and planning, representatives of the Institute of Town Planners India, Indian Institute of Architects, University Grants Commission, School of Planning and Architecture, Delhi and All India Council for Technical Education.

== Academics ==
=== Academic programmes ===
The Institute conducts educational programmes leading to the degree of Bachelor of Architecture (B. Arch.), Bachelor of Planning (B. Plan.) Master of Architecture (M. Arch.), Master of Planning (M. Plan) and Doctor of Philosophy (PhD.) in the following areas:

Degree	Specialization
Bachelor of Architecture (B.Arch)	Architectural design and Building construction.
Bachelor of Planning (B.Plan)	Settlement design, developmental economics, photogrammetry and Remote Sensing, rural development, utilities and services planning, project planning, operations research, real estate valuation, disaster management, transport planning, housing, infrastructure planning, land use zoning and environmental monitoring.
Master of Architecture (M. Arch)	Sustainable Architecture.
Master of Architecture (M. Arch)	Landscape Architecture.
Master of Planning (M. Plan)	Environmental Planning and Management
Master of Planning (M. Plan)	Urban and Regional Planning
Master of Planning (M. Plan)	Transportation and Infrastructure Planning
Doctor of Philosophy (PhD.)	All Architecture and Planning disciplines, interdisciplinary areas, humanities and social sciences.

=== Admission ===
Admissions to the under graduate programme is through the Joint Entrance Examination (JEE) conducted by the National Testing Agency, India. Foreign nationals, non-resident Indians (NRIs) and persons of Indian origin (PIOs) candidates are eligible to apply and should have qualifications from the foreign boards/universities recognized as equivalent by the Association of Indian Universities (AIU) to be shortlisted for further evaluations.

=== Rankings ===
Institute rankings

Architecture – India
- NIRF (2024): 16

In 2024, SPA Vijayawada was ranked 16th in architecture by the National Institutional Ranking Framework (NIRF).

== Student life ==
The present campus started with two hostels. As the intake has gradually increased, today the school has four hostels. For the first three-year students, a separate hostel has been set up that can house almost 200 — future proof for the substantial increase in intake planned. In addition to these, school has a special quarters which houses visiting students and guest faculties. Two hostels are dedicated for final-year students with over special accommodation.

Dedicated mess facilities and round-the-clock canteen facilities are available between the hostels. The common rooms at the hostels have a 20" LCD TV with satellite cable, in addition to the facilities for playing indoor games. It is the scene of action for get-togethers, parties and informal discussions.

== See also ==
- School of Planning and Architecture
- School of Planning and Architecture, Delhi
- Ministry of Human Resource Development
- Vijayawada
- T-Square
- Pencil
