= College of Architecture and Planning =

College of Architecture and Planning may refer to:

- Ball State University Estopinal College of Architecture and Planning
- University of Utah College of Architecture and Planning
