= Schools of Planning and Architecture =

Autonomous Indian public design institute group

- Other name: SPA or SPAs (plural)
- Type: Public; Institutes of National Importance
- Established: 1941; 85 years ago (later came under the SPA Act 2014)
- Chairperson: Union Minister of Education (SPA Council)
- Visitor: President of India
- Location: 3 cities in India; Delhi; Bhopal; Vijayawada
- Language: English

Location of the SPAs

The Schools of Planning and Architecture (SPAs) are centrally funded technical institutes located across India. They are a group of autonomous public institutes of higher education under Ministry of Education, Government of India. They were established with the objectives of providing quality Architecture and physical planning education. The SPAs primarily offer undergraduate, postgraduate, doctoral and executive education programmes.

Each SPA is autonomous and exercises independent control over its day-to-day operations. However, the administration of all SPAs and the overall strategy of SPAs is overseen by the SPA council. The SPA Council is headed by India's Minister of Human Resource Development (MHRD) and consists of the chairpersons and directors of all SPAs and senior officials from the MHRD.

== Institutes ==
The SPAs lists three institutes located at Bhopal, New Delhi and Vijayawada.

SPAs and locations, sorted alphabetically
| Name | Short name | Established | City/town | State | Website |
|---|---|---|---|---|---|
| SPA New Delhi | SPA-D | 1941 (1959^{‡}) | New Delhi | Delhi | spa.ac.in |
| SPA Bhopal | SPA-B | 2008 | Bhopal | Madhya Pradesh | spabhopal.ac.in |
| SPA Vijayawada | SPA-V | 2008 | Vijayawada | Andhra Pradesh | spav.ac.in |

‡ – year converted to SPA

== History ==
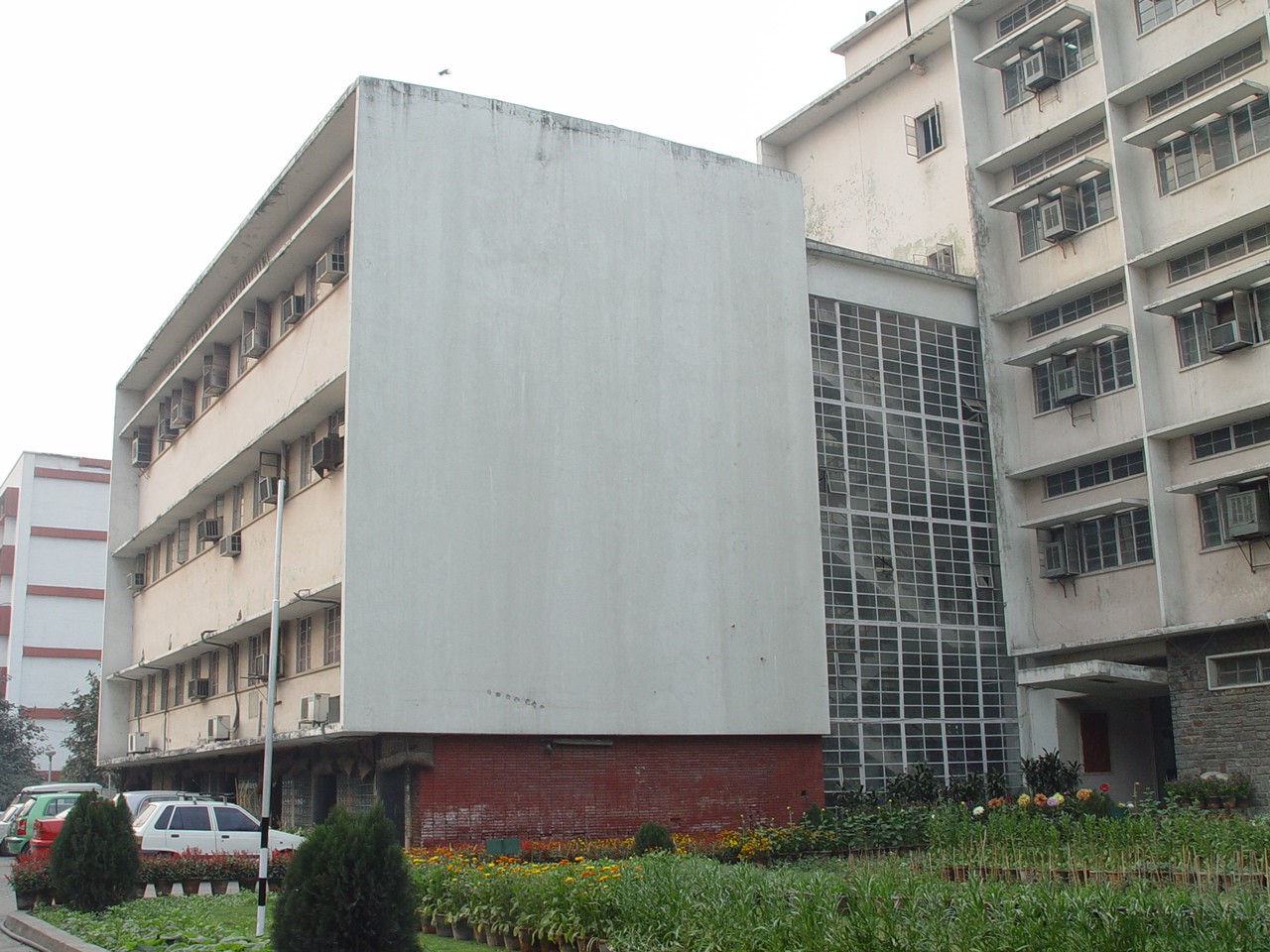
Planning Block of SPA Delhi

The history of the SPA system dates back to 1946 when Sir Jogendra Singh of the Viceroy's Executive Council set up a committee whose task was to consider the creation of Higher Technical Institutions for post-war industrial development in India. The 22-member committee, headed by Nalini Ranjan Sarkar, recommended the establishment of these institutions in various parts of India, along the lines of the Massachusetts Institute of Technology and consulting from the University of Illinois at Urbana–Champaign with affiliated secondary institutions.

The first School of Planning and Architecture was founded in 1941 as a Department of Architecture of Delhi College of Engineering now the Delhi Technological University. It was affiliated to the University of Delhi and integrated with the School of Town and Country Planning which was established in 1955 by the Government of India to provide facilities for rural, urban and regional planning. On integration, the school was renamed as School of Planning and Architecture in 1959. Recognizing its national and international eminence, the Government of India conferred the status of 'Deemed University' on the school in 1979. This entitled the SPA, New Delhi to broaden and deepen its academic horizons by introducing new academic programmes, and by promoting critical research activities.

On the request of Ministry of Human Resource Development, Government of India a project report was prepared by Institute of Town Planners, India (ITPI) for establishing four new Schools of Planning & Architecture in the country. Based on this report the Government took a decision to establish two SPAs, one in Bhopal and the other in Vijayawada.

== Organisational structure ==
The Minister of Education is the most powerful person in the organisational structure of SPAs, being the Chairman, General Council. Under the SPA Council is the Board of Governors of each SPA. Under the Board of Governors is the Director, who is the chief academic and executive officer of the SPA. Under the Director, in the organisational structure, comes the Heads of Departments, Registrar, President of the Students' Council, and Chairman of the Hall Management Committee. The Registrar is the chief administrative officer of the SPA and overviews the day-to-day operations. Below the Heads of Department (HOD) are the faculty members (Professors, Associate Professors, and Assistant Professors). The Wardens come under the Chairman of the Hall Management Committee.

== Admission ==
The SPAs have a common admission process for undergraduate admissions. It was called AIEEE, which was replaced by Joint Entrance Examination - Main in 2013. Admission to most postgraduate courses in SPAs is granted through various interviews and Graduate Aptitude Test in Engineering. The admission for Ph.D. shall possess the following qualifications:- Master's Degree in Urban Planning or Regional Planning or Environmental Planning or Housing or Transport Planning or Landscape Architecture or Urban Design or Architectural Conservation or Building Engineering and Management or Industrial Design conducted by the School, or equivalent from any other recognized university or institution with a minimum of 55 percent aggregate marks; or Bachelor's degree in Planning or Architecture of the School or its equivalent from any other recognized university or institution with a minimum of 55 percent aggregate marks and five years experience in teaching, research or professional practice.

Relaxation in the aggregate marks specified above may be made in case of exceptionally qualified applicants.

=== Entrance examinations ===
Admission to undergraduate programs in all SPAs is tied to the Entrance Examination, popularly known as JEE-Main. Candidates who qualify admission via Joint Entrance Examination - Main can apply for admission in B.Arch. (Bachelor of Architecture) and B.Plan. (Bachelor of Planning) courses in SPAs. The examination has three sections: Mathematics, Drawing, and Aptitude. Mathematics, and Aptitude sections have multiple choice objective-type questions and the Drawing section has drawing-based questions. The number of questions and their maximum marks have been variable through the years. The questions are based on a syllabus that is common to syllabi of all the state boards in India and the Central Board of Secondary Education. Candidates can opt for question papers either in English or in Hindi language. The examination was conducted in offline pen and paper mode till 2010. In 2011, as per the orders of the Ministry of Human Resource Development, CBSE conducted Paper 1 in Computer-Based-Test mode for the first one lakh candidates who opted for the same, while the remaining students took the examination in the conventional pen and paper mode. The number of attempts which a candidate can avail at the examination is limited to three in consecutive years.

=== Reservation policy ===
SPA has an affirmative action policy on caste-based reserved quotas. As per the provisions in the Indian constitution, the SPAs have been reserving seats for Scheduled Castes of society since 1973.

As per the rules, all the Scheduled Caste (SC) and Scheduled Tribe (ST) candidates must take the JEE with the rest of the students. Based on the results of AIEEE but using relaxed admissions criteria, SC and ST candidates are offered admission. There is no relaxation on the criteria for passing the exams or graduating a course. The candidates admitted through the reservation policy are also subjected to the same criteria as the general candidates for graduation.

== Education ==
The SPAs function autonomously, and their special status as Institutes of National Importance facilitates the smooth running of SPAs, virtually free from both regional as well as student politics. Such autonomy means that SPAs can create their own curricula and adapt rapidly to the changes in educational requirements, free from bureaucratic hurdles. The government has no direct control over internal policy decisions of SPAs (like faculty recruitment and curricula) but has representation on the SPA Council. The medium of instruction in all SPAs is English. The classes are usually held between 8:30 a.m. and 5:30 p.m., though there are some variations within each SPA. All the SPAs have public libraries for the use of their students. The electronic libraries allow students to access on-line journals and periodicals.

School offers planning, architecture and design courses both at undergraduate and postgraduate levels. While the Bachelor of Architecture course is one of the oldest in the country, highly successful Bachelor of Planning course was started in 1989. The school offers 10 postgraduate programmes and 2 undergraduate programmes along with the doctoral programmes run by all the departments of studies.

== Recognition ==
SPAs have a special status as "Institutes of National Importance" under an act of Parliament, due to which the degrees provided by SPAs need not be recognized by the AICTE. The JEE and GATE are important factor behind the success of SPAs, as it enables the SPAs to accept only a select group of meritorious students. This combination of success factors has led to the concept of the SPA Brand. Other factors that have contributed to the success of SPAs are stringent faculty recruitment procedures and industry collaboration. The procedure for selection of faculty in SPAs is stricter as compared to other colleges offering similar degrees.

=== Educational rankings ===
Nationwide, SPAs ranked above any other architecture college. Worldwide, SPA Delhi is ranked 7th in Asia for architecture. and is also ranked as one of the top 10 graduate planning education institute in the world along with MIT, UCL and others. It is now an established brand name for excellence in planning and architecture education. Within seventy five years of its existence, the School has established a reputation as the nation’s leading institution for imparting professional education in town and country planning, architecture and design.

== Notable alumni ==
- Arundhati Roy, writer
- Baburam Bhattarai, 36th Prime Minister of Nepal
- Eugene Pandala, Indian architect known for building with environmental sustainability
- Gerard da Cunha, Indian architect of the famous Nrityagram
- Hisila Yami, former Minister of Physical Planning, Government of Nepal
- Raj Rewal, architect
- Revathi Kamath, pioneer of mud architecture in India
- Pavani Rao Boddapati, Award winning Visual Effects Supervisor, Avatar: The Way of Water, Avatar: Fire and Ash

SPA Alumni is an autonomous body of the alumni of the School of Planning and Architecture, New Delhi. It was registered in 1992 under the Societies Registration Act of 1860.

== In popular culture ==
- The movie In Which Annie Gives It Those Ones (1989) directed by Arundhati Roy is based on the life of students of the college and was filmed at SPA.

== See also ==
- School of Planning and Architecture (India)
