= School of Planning and Architecture, Bhopal =

Architecture school in Bhopal, India

- Motto: Sthapatiḥ sthāpanārhaḥ syāt sarvaśāstraviśāradaḥ
- Motto in English: The architect should be proficient in all sciences.
- Type: Public university
- Established: 2008; 18 years ago
- Academic affiliations: AIU; INI
- Chairperson: H. D. Charan
- Director: Dr. Kailasa Rao M.
- Students: 700-800
- Location: Bhopal, Madhya Pradesh, India
- Campus: 75 acres
- Nickname: SPA Bhopal
- Website: www.spabhopal.ac.in

The School of Planning and Architecture, Bhopal (SPA Bhopal) is a higher education institute in Bhopal, Madhya Pradesh, India, specializing in education and research in the field of Urban Planning, Architecture and Design. It is one of the three Schools of Planning and Architecture (SPAs) established by the Ministry of Education, Government of India in 2008 as an autonomous institute and a fully Centrally Funded Technical Institution (CFTI). It is one of the Institutes of National Importance of MoE India along with IITs, NITs and AIIMS. It forms a part of the league along with the other two SPAs: SPA Vijaywada and SPA Delhi. In 2014, Lok Sabha passed a bill to make all the three SPAs "centres of excellence" on the pattern of IITs and IIMs.

== Admission ==
Admissions to the under-graduate programme is through the JEE (B.Arch) conducted by the Central Board of Secondary Education (CBSE), India. Foreign nationals, Non-Resident Indians (NRIs) and persons of Indian origin (PIOs) candidates are eligible to apply and should have qualifications from the foreign boards/universities recognised as equivalent by the Association of Indian Universities(AIU) to be shortlisted for further evaluations.

For the postgraduate and doctoral admissions SPA Bhopal admits through the Entrance Test including an objective one-hour test and an interview.

The institute conducts educational programmes leading to the degree of Bachelor of Architecture (B. Arch.), Bachelor of Planning (B. Plan.) Master of Architecture (M. Arch.) in Architectural Conservation, Landscape and Urban Design; Master of Planning (M. Plan) in Urban & Regional Planning, Environmental Planning and Transport & Logistics Planning; Master of Design (M.Des) and Doctor of Philosophy (PhD).

== Campus ==
The institute's 75-acre campus is located in Bhauri, Bhopal. The two buildings of the proposed Amenity Centre Building currently functions as the Academic Unit of the Campus. It houses all the departments and programmes. Within the campus there is one hostel for boys, one for the girls and a third hostel with two wings, one wing for boys and another wing for girls. Many faculty members and administrative staff members reside in the campus. The campus has courts and fields for sports activities like Basketball, Volleyball, Badminton, Football and Cricket.

== Ranking ==
University rankings

Architecture – India
- NIRF (2024): 12

In 2024, SPA Bhopal was ranked 12th in architecture by the National Institutional Ranking Framework (NIRF).
