= National Association of Students of Architecture =

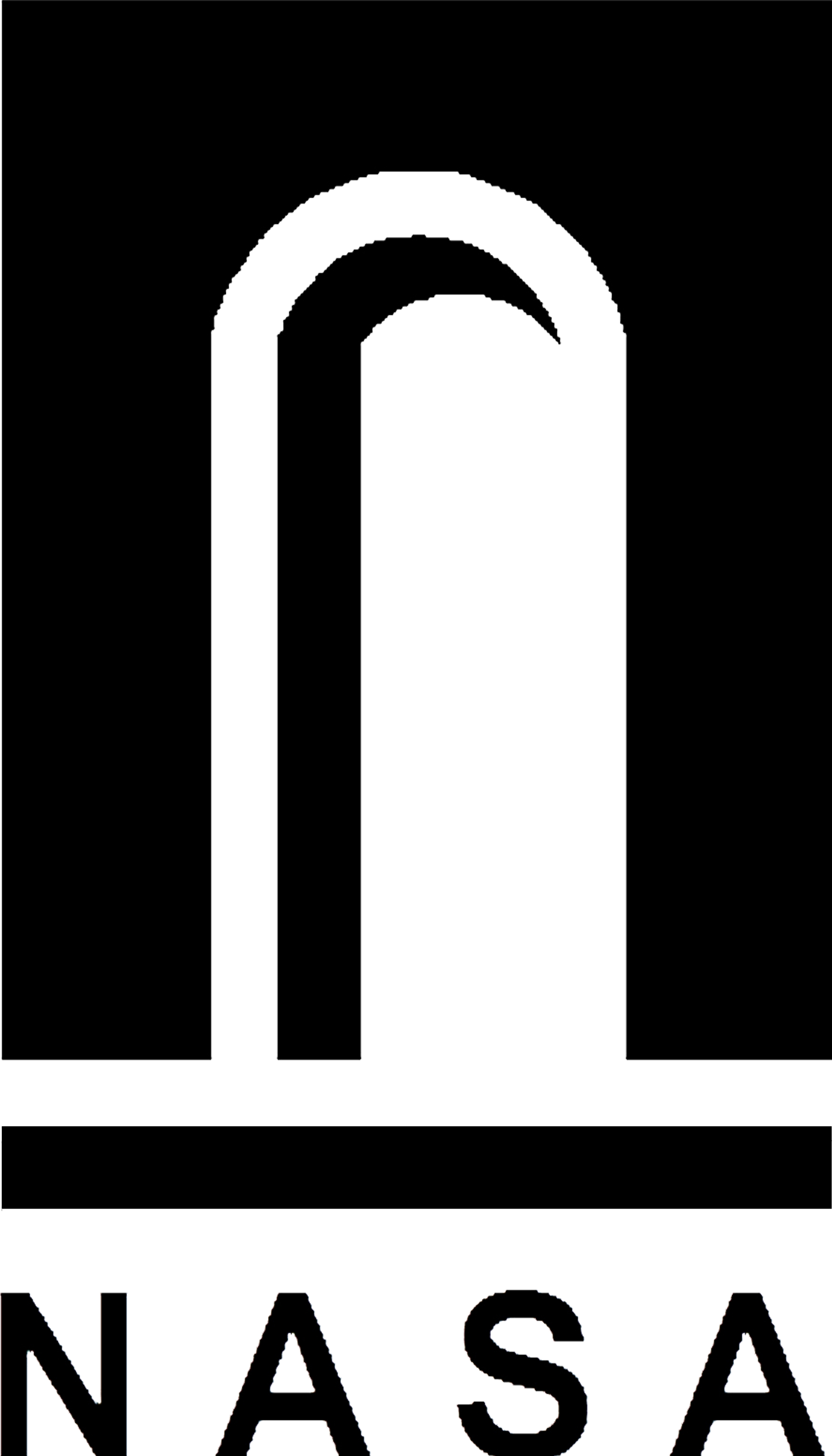
- Established: 1957
- Type: Student Association
- Location: School of Planning and Architecture, Dept. of Architecture, New Delhi
- Region served: India
- Website: http://nasaindia.co

The National Association of Students of Architecture (NASA India) is an architectural student organisation with over 300+ associated colleges all over India and around the world. NASA India's primary objective is to establish a platform for architecture students to learn and engage, directly and indirectly, through both online and offline resources. NASA India conducts programs, events, conventions, seminars, workshops & trophies, and several other activities that aim to enhance the holistic development of students. NASA India is an autonomous, non-profitable, non-political, non-religious, and democratic body for the undergraduate students of Architecture in India. NASA India is a non-profit and non-political association registered under the Societies Act 1860 vides no. 24786 as applicable to the National Capital Territory of New Delhi, India. NASA India has its headquarters currently located at the Department of Architecture, School of Planning and Architecture, New Delhi.

== Collaborations ==
NASA is associated with many institutions across the world,

- Indian Heritage Cities Network – UNESCO or IHCN-UNESCO
- Housing and Urban Development Corporation of India (HUDCO)
- Indian Society of Landscape Architects (ISOLA) IFLA
- Laurie Baker Centre for Habitat Studies
- Association of Designers of India (ADI)
- Virasat Foundation
- GRIHA
- University of Westminster
- ArchiDesign Awards
- Ethos India
- Indian Institute of Photography

== See also ==
- The Annual NASA Convention
