= M.V. Ramana Murthy =

Indian coastal scientist

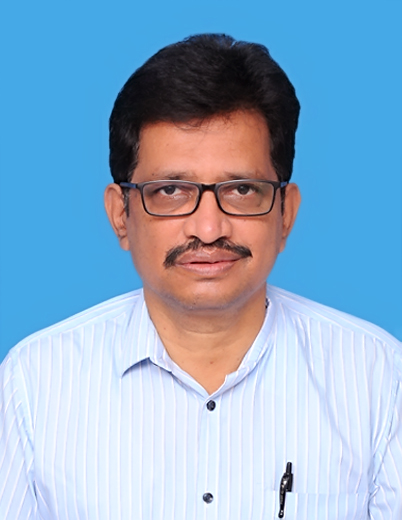
- Born: Warangal, Telangana, India
- Education: IIT Chennai; CEPT Ahmedabad; Acharya Nagarjuna University
- Occupations: Director for Deep Ocean mission and National Centre for Coastal Research; Member of National Biodiversity Authority (NBA); Senate member at Tamil Nadu Dr. M.G.R. Medical University

M.V. Ramana Murthy is an Indian coastal scientist and ocean engineer. He is the Mission Director for the Deep Ocean mission and Director at the National Centre for Coastal Research (NCCR) of the Indian Ministry of Earth Sciences (MoES).

He is the former Director of the Centre for Marine Living Resources & Ecology.

== Education and career ==
Murthy completed his Bachelor's degree in Civil engineering at Acharya Nagarjuna University, Andhra Pradesh. He completed his Master's and Ph.D. in Ocean Engineering at Indian Institute of Technology, Madras. He also has a master's degree in Planning from CEPT Ahmedabad's School of Planning.

He started his career in 1991 as a Senior Engineer at the Visakhapatnam Port Trust and was an employee of Engineers India, Ltd. In 1999 he joined as a scientist at the National Centre for Coastal Research, Chennai. He then served as the group leader at the National Institute of Ocean Technology, Chennai leading the Ocean Structures & Island Desalination group from 2009 to 2017.

Murthy's work primarily regards researching techniques and advising policies regarding coastal protection of sea-side towns and coastal infrastructure across India. Examples of his work included the establishment of several desalination plants in Lakshadweep, India, and the design of a sea dyke across the Gulf of Khambhat.

He is a member of the Expert Appraisal Committee of the Ministry of Environment, Forest and Climate Change. He is also an advisor to the Indian National Disaster Management Authority on how the agency can help people displaced by flooding and erosion. He is a member of the Indian National Biodiversity Authority. He is a member of the Academic Council, Kerala University of Fisheries and Ocean Studies, and a senate member at Tamil Nadu Dr. M.G.R. Medical University.

== Awards ==
- National Award of Excellence 2021 in Ocean Technology, Ministry of Earth Sciences
- National Geo Science Award, 2010
- Outstanding contribution in the field of Disaster Management, Ministry of Mines, Ministry of Earth Sciences Award, 2006

== Research and publications ==
- Litter and plastic monitoring in the Indian marine environment.Environmental Science and Pollution Research; Environmental Science and Pollution Research, 2022
- Study of microplastics in the coastal waters in Bay of Bengal, 2022, vol:303
- Three Decades of Indian Remote Sensing in Coastal Research, 2021, Journal of the Indian Society of Remote Sensing
- Nutrient dynamics and budgeting in a semi-enclosed coastal hypersaline lagoon, 2021, Environmental Science and Pollution Research
- Connecting India's coastal monitoring program with UN Sustainable Development Goal 14, 2021, vol:215
- Prescribing sea water quality criteria through species sensitivity distribution, 2021
- Numerical studies on the thermal regimes of the horizontal tube falling film evaporation under varying feeder height, 2020, vol:17
- A review on the applications and recent advances in environmental DNA (eDNA) metagenomics, 2019
- Modification of tsunami wave by submarine canyon: case study of multiple canyons at south east coast of India, 2011, vol:34
