= Pourquoi Pas =

Pourquoi Pas (from French pourquoi pas? 'why not?') may refer to:

== Ships ==
- Four ships owned by the French navigator and naval officer Jean-Baptiste Charcot:
  - Pourquoi-Pas (1893), a 19.5-metre (64 ft) cutter that Charcot had built in 1893 and in which he made a 2-week voyage in 1894. He sold her in 1896 to buy Pourquoi Pas ? II
  - Pourquoi-Pas (1896), the new name given by Charcot to a 26-metre (85 ft) wooden schooner he bought in 1896, sold in 1897, and bought back in 1897; from 1897 he sailed her in British waters and in 1902 sailed towards Iceland, entering the Arctic Circle for the first time and approaching the glaciers
  - Pourquoi-Pas (1897), the new name given by Charcot to a 31-metre (102 ft) iron schooner with a steam-engine he acquired in 1897 and in which he sailed down the River Nile as far as Aswan with the millionaire Vanderbilt
  - Pourquoi-Pas (1908), a French research vessel in operation from 1908 until it wrecked in 1936.
- Pourquoi Pas? (2005), a research vessel of the IFREMER and the French Navy, named in honour of the previous ships

== Geography ==
- Pourquoi Pas Island, an island of Antarctica
- Pourquoi Pas Point, a headland of Antarctica

== Other uses ==
- Pourquoi pas! (Why Not!), a 1977 French film starring Sami Frey
