= Matsya 6000 =

Indian crewed submersible vehicle

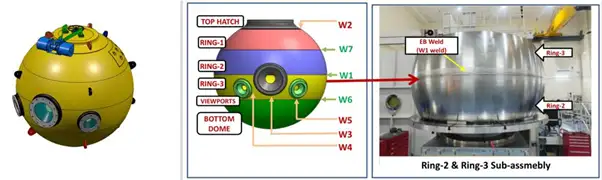
- Diagram of Matsya 6000

History

India
- Name: Matsya 6000
- Ordered: 16 June 2021
- Builder: National Institute of Ocean Technology; Indian Space Research Organisation
- Cost: ₹350 crore (US$36 million)
- Sponsored by: Ministry of Earth Sciences
- Status: In development

General characteristics
- Type: Deep-submergence vehicle
- Endurance: 96 hours
- Test depth: 6,000 m (20,000 ft)
- Complement: 3

Matsya 6000 (Devanagari: मत्स्य ६०००) (Sanskrit, transl. "Fish 6000") is an Indian crewed deep-submergence vehicle intended to be utilised for deep-sea exploration of rare minerals under the Samudrayaan mission. Currently under development, the vehicle would consist of a titanium alloy sphere of 80mm thickness along with a diameter of 2.1m which can withstand the pressure of 600 bar.

== History ==
On 31 August 2019, while replying to a query about deep sea mining, the then director of NIOT (National Institute of Ocean Technology) Dr. M.A. Atmanand, who was at the facility of Titagarh Wagons to inaugurate coastal research vessel Sagar Anveshika, said that in line with the Gaganyaan mission of ISRO, NIOT was proposing a project to send a submersible vehicle with three persons to a depth of about 6000 metres to carry out deep underwater studies. He further added that the success of the Samudrayaan mission will help India join the league of developed nations in exploration of minerals from oceans.

The project was supposed to get final approval from the Ministry of Finance in October 2019, but the final approval was delayed and was granted on 16 June 2021.

== Development ==
On 27 October 2021, NIOT conducted an uncrewed trial of the ‘personnel sphere,’ built of mild steel, using the ORV Sagar Nidhi, in Bay of Bengal. For the trial, the personnel sphere was lowered up to a depth of 6000 metres, off the coast of Chennai. After successful trial and receiving certification, the union minister of state (independent charge) science and technology Jitendra Singh formally launched the project on 29 October 2021. The entire project was allocated ₹4,077 crore (US$422 million) for a period of five years.

The first wet-test or submerged test of the capsule will take place in October 2024 in the Chennai harbour at a depth of 15 meters,followed by another dive to 500 meters. A shallow water test was planned in 2025 and the final unmanned deep sea tests in 2026.The craft is expected to conduct its first manned test-dive till 6000 meters by 2027. However this was delayed by six months due to a delay in procuring synthetic foam cladding for the outer hull of the vessel from France and Norway.

As of February 2026, NIOT is planning the first dive to 500 meters by May.

== See also ==
- Samudrayaan
- Ictineu 3
- Deepsea Challenger
- DSV Limiting Factor
- Nautile
