= Deep Ocean mission =

Indian deep sea exploration mission

Deep Ocean Mission
Public research agency overview
- Formed: 2018
- Jurisdiction: India
- Annual budget: ▲₹600 crore (equivalent to ₹620 crore or US$66 million in 2026) (FY25)
- Minister responsible: Dr. Jitendra Singh
- Parent Public research agency: Ministry of Earth Sciences

Deep Ocean Mission (informally known as Samudrayaan program, from Sanskrit: Samudra 'Sea', Yāna 'Craft, Vehicle'),or currently known as "Samudra Manthan Mission"(Churning of Sea),is an Indian initiative to undertake the deep ocean exploration focused on India's exclusive economic zones and continental shelf. The program will consist of various crewed and uncrewed submersibles exploring the sea bed. One of the primary aims of the mission is to explore and extract polymetallic nodules, which are composed of minerals like manganese, nickel, cobalt, copper and iron hydroxide. The metals can be used in the manufacturing of electronic devices, smartphones, batteries and solar panels.

In 2016, India was allocated a 75,000 km^{2} (29,000 sq mi) site in the Central Indian Ocean Basin by the International Seabed Authority for the purposes of exploring for and extracting polymetallic nodules on the seabed. The estimated amount of polymetallic nodules in the given area is about 380 million tonnes, containing 4.7 million tonnes of nickel, 4.29 million tonnes of copper and 0.55 million tonnes of cobalt and 92.59 million tonnes of manganese. The approximate cost of the programme will be ₹4077 crore for a of 5-year period and this will be implemented in a phase-wise process. The first phase of the project is from 2021 to 2024. Under its sub-project informally dubbed Samudrayaan, India has aims to send three people into deep sea up to a depth of 6 km (3.7 mi) in Indian Ocean in an indigenous deep sea submersible having an endurance of 72 hours.

In 2025, India secured another contract from the International Seabed Authority to explore the Carlsberg Ridge, becoming the first nation to have two separate contracts with the ISA for deep sea exploration.

== History ==
The study of the ocean in India began when the Government sponsored the program on polymetallic nodules (PMN) initiated at CSIR-NIO with the collection of the first nodule sample from Arabian Sea on board the first research vessel Gaveshani on 26 January 1981.

The International Seabed Authority (ISA), an autonomous international organisation established under the 1982 United Nations Convention on the Law of the Sea, allotted the area for deep-sea mining. India was the first country to receive the status of a 'Pioneer Investor' in 1987 and was given an area of about 1.5 lakh km^{2} in the Central Indian Ocean Basin (CIOB) for nodule exploration.

This was based on the extensive survey carried out by the scientists of CSIR-NIO on several research ships leading to the allocation of an area of 150,000 km^{2} (58,000 sq mi) to the country with exclusive right under the UN law of the sea.

India was the first country in the world, to have sponsored the exploration of deep sea mineral viz polymetallic nodules, in the central Indian Ocean basin in 1987.

In 2002, India signed a contract with the ISA and after complete resource analysis of the seabed 50% was surrendered and the country retained an area of 75,000 km^{2}.

Further studies have helped narrow the mining area to 18,000 km^{2} which will be the ‘First Generation Mine-site’.

== Background ==
India has an Exclusive Economic Zone allocated 2,200,000 km^{2} (850,000 sq mi) which is unexplored and unutilised.

Exclusive Economic zones are boundaries prescribed by the United Nations Convention on the law of the sea which give the rights to a state regarding the exploration and use of marine resources.

India has been allocated a site of 75,000 km^{2} (29,000 sq mi) in Central Indian Ocean Basin (CIOB) by the United Nations' International Seabed Authority (ISA) for the exploitation of polymetallic nodules (PMN) which is an amalgamation of iron and manganese hydroxide.

It has been estimated that 380 million metric tonnes of PMN are available at the bottom of the seas in the central Indian Ocean.

It is estimated that 10% of recovery of that can meet India's energy requirement for next 100 years.

== Goals and objectives ==
The centre has drawn up a five-year plan, with a cost of ₹4,077 crore, to mine, research and study about the ocean floor.

The objectives of the plan include research work that can result in formation of a roadmap on climate change and help in developing a desalination plant powered by OTEC energy.

One of the key projects which can enable the above said research is the creation of a submersible vehicle that can explore depths of at least 6,000 m (20,000 ft).

== Program vehicle ==
Indian Space Research Organisation developed the design of a crewed submersible capsule capable of travelling 6,000 m deep for the mission. The development was announced on the sidelines of the silver jubilee celebrations of the National Institute of Ocean Technology. A deep-submergence vehicle named Matsya 6000 is under development.

In July 2021, an Autonomous Underwater Vehicle (AUV) named the Ocean Mineral Explorer 6000 or Matsya 6000, was deployed to explore the Polymetallic Manganese Nodule site.

The first uncrewed trial of the vehicle was conducted on 27 October 2021 where the personnel sphere was lowered up to a depth of 600 m, off the coast of Chennai. The trial was successful and received the certification for further development. Following the success of the trial, the Samudrayaan program was formally launched on 29 October 2021.

In December 2022, the submersible explored 14 square kms of seabed for 56 hours.

The Matsya 6000 is due to hold its first wet test at the end of October 2024; the submersible is due to be submerged at 15 metres in the Chennai harbour to evaluate its performance. A shallow water test was planned in 2025; unmanned deep sea tests are due to be held in 2026.

== See also ==
- National Institute of Ocean Technology
- Indian Space Research Organisation
- Matsya 6000
