= FORV Sagar Sampada =

History

India
- Name: FORV Sagar Sampada
- Owner: Ministry of Earth Sciences
- Operator: Centre for Marine Living Resources & Ecology
- Port of registry: Kochi, India
- Builder: Euroflex Marine, Aarhus, Denmark
- Launched: 1984
- Identification: IMO number: 8300080; MMSI number: 419323000; Call sign: VWXS
- Status: Active as of 2018

General characteristics
- Type: Fishery protection/research vessel
- Tonnage: 2,661 GT; 1,140 DWT
- Length: 71.5 m (234 ft 7 in)
- Beam: 16.4 m (53 ft 10 in)
- Draught: 5.6 m (18 ft 4 in)
- Propulsion: 1 × 2,285 hp (1,704 kW) engine
- Speed: 13 knots (24 km/h; 15 mph)
- Range: 13,000 nmi (24,000 km; 15,000 mi)
- Endurance: 15 days
- Complement: 34 crew + 22 scientists

Fishery Oceanographic Research Vessel Sagar Sampada (FORV Sagar Sampada) is an Indian research vessel that is equipped to carry out multidisciplinary research in oceanography, marine biology and fishery science. This is the unique facility of the country equipped to undertake oceanography and fisheries (demersal) in the same platform. The vessel is currently managed and operated by the Centre for Marine Living Resources & Ecology (CMLRE), Kochi, a research institute attached to the Ministry of Earth Sciences, Government of India, and is operated from Kochi. FORV Sagar Sampada is a platform for interdisciplinary expeditions in and around the Indian Exclusive Economic Zone, and in International waters with participation from various institutions, from India and abroad.

Built in Denmark, the vessel was commissioned at Mumbai in 1984. As of March 2020, FORV Sagar Sampada has completed 397 oceanographic expeditions, which includes one expedition to the Southern Ocean in the winter of 1995-96 for surveying fishery resources in Antarctic waters (Krill Expedition, FIKEX 1995), one in the southern Ocean with port call at Mauritius and one in the Northern Arabian Sea with port call at Muscat, Oman.

The vessel has an overall length of 72.5m and is ice strengthened. The scientific facilities onboard includes, SeaBird CTD (Conductivity-Temperature-Depth) Profiler, Acoustic Doppler Current Profiler (75kHz), Skalar Autoanalyser for nutrient analysis, AutoSal, Multiple Plankton Net (MPN), Grab, Dredge, Bongo Net for fish egg larvae and surface zooplankton collections, VELNet for Fish egg/larvae collection from the upper 10m, Multiple Frequency Echo Sounders (200 kHz, 120 kHz and 38 kHz), Side Scan Sonar, Integrated Trawl Instrumentation System, Integrated Fish Finding System, Automated Weather Stations, Facilities for fishing operations up to a depth of 1,200 metres (3,900 ft), facilities for sediment core sample collection etc. Recently the research facilities are augmented with Continuous Under way Fish Egg Sampler (CUFES), with the technical support of NOAA, USA, 2 Big eye binoculars for the mammal watching and a Thermosalinograph. The vessel can accommodate 24 research personnel and 35 crew.
