= Abyss Box =

High-pressure aquarium

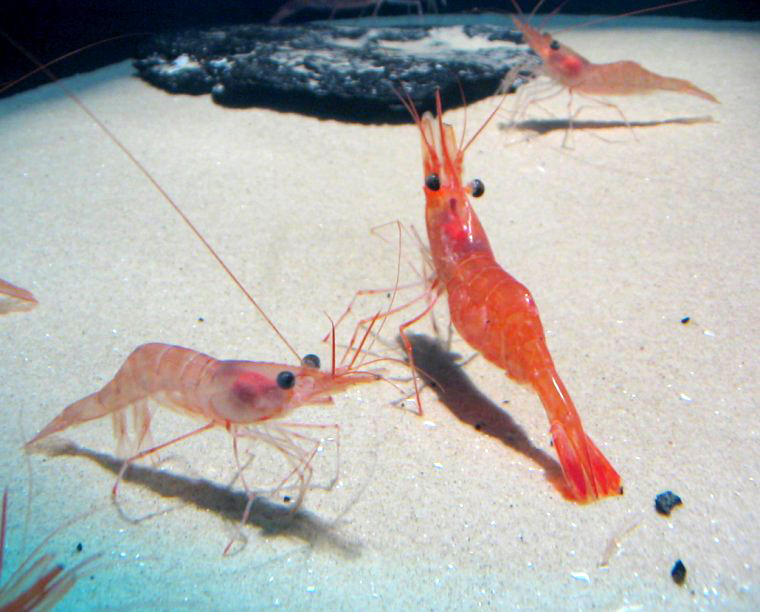
Pandalus borealis is one of the hardy species initially chosen to be kept in the Abyss Box

Deep sea zones

The Abyss Box is a vessel containing 16 litres (3.5 imp gal; 4.2 US gal) of water at the very high pressure of 18 megapascals to simulate the natural underwater environment of bathyal fauna living at about 1,800 metres (5,900 ft) below the surface. It is on display at Oceanopolis aquarium in Brest, France. It was designed by French researcher Bruce Shillito from Pierre and Marie Curie University in Paris.

All the equipment maintaining the extreme pressure inside the Abyss Box weighs 600 kilograms (1,300 lb). The device keeps deep-dwelling creatures alive so they can be studied, especially regarding their adaptability to warmer ocean temperatures. Currently the Abyss Box houses only common species of deep sea creatures including a deep sea crab, Bythograea thermydron and a deep sea prawn, Pandalus borealis, which are some of the hardier species with a higher survival rate in depressurized environments. The fauna on display were collected by Victor 6000, a specialised remotely operated vehicle (ROV).

== See also ==
- Abyssal plain
- Deep sea
- Deep sea creature
- Deep ocean water
- Submarine landslide
- The Blue Planet
- Shutdown of thermohaline circulation
