= IFREMER =

French oceanographic institution

French Research Institute for Exploitation of the Sea
- Institut français de recherche pour l'exploitation de la mer (French)

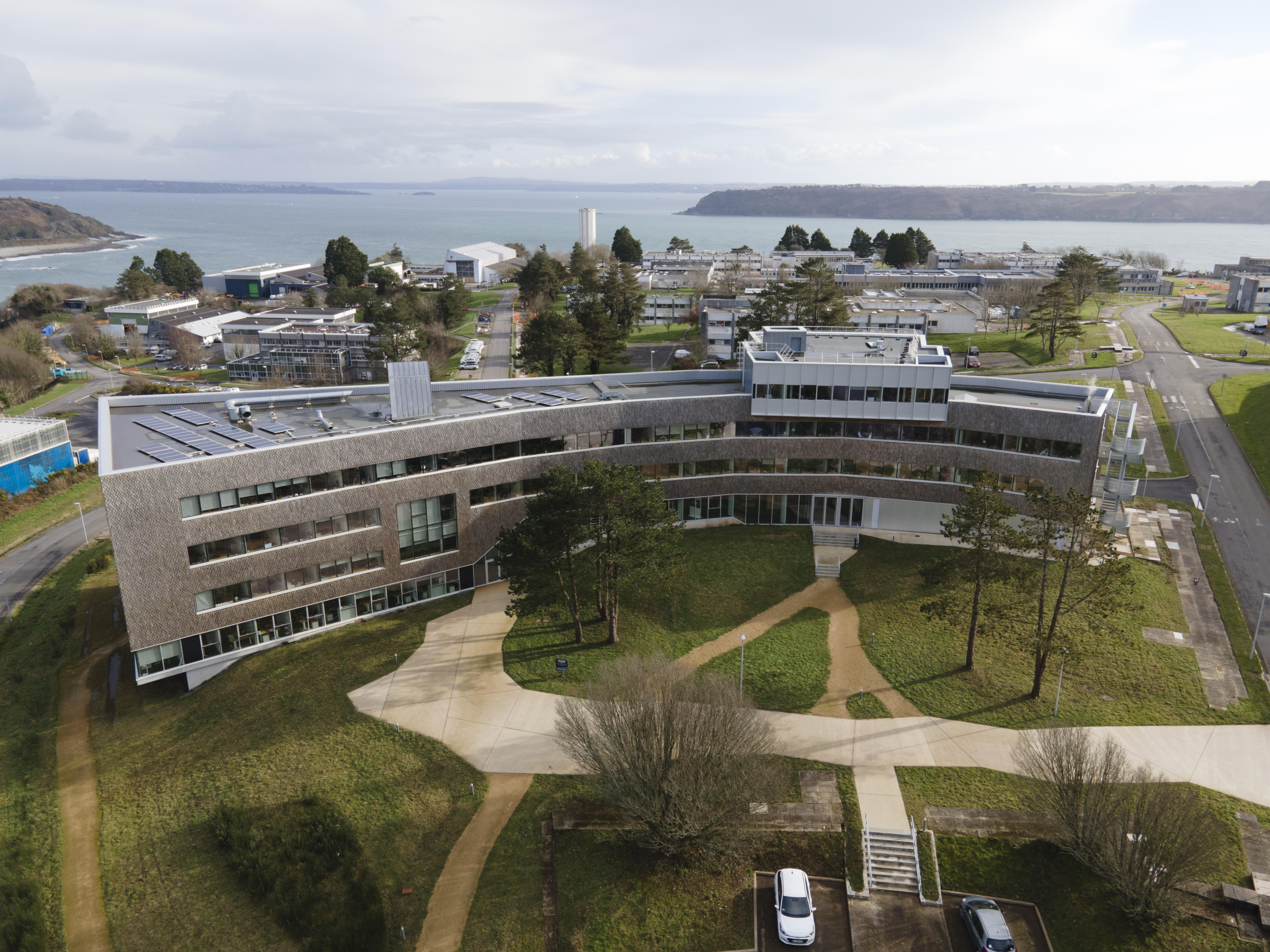
- Ifremer centre in Plouzané

Agency overview
- Formed: 1984
- Preceding agencies: CNEXO: Centre National pour l'Exploitation des Océans (French for 'National Centre for the Exploitation of the Oceans'); Institut Scientifique et Technique des Pêches Maritimes (French for 'Scientific and technical institute for marine fisheries')
- Headquarters: Brest, France
- Employees: 1,593
- Annual budget: 213 million euros
- Agency executive: François Houllier, Président directeur général (CEO)
- Website: https://www.ifremer.fr/

The Institut Français de Recherche pour l'Exploitation de la Mer (French for 'French Research Institute for Exploitation of the Sea') or Ifremer is an oceanographic institution in France. A state-run and funded scientific organization, it is France's national integrated marine science research institute. Ifremer operates a number of research vessels and other vehicles, including the ROV Victor 6000 and the crewed submersible Nautile.

== Scope of works ==
Ifremer focuses its research activities in the following areas:

- Monitoring, use and enhancement of coastal seas
- Monitoring and optimization of aquaculture production
- Fishery resources
- Exploration and exploitation of the oceans and their biodiversity
- Circulation and marine ecosystems, mechanisms, trends and forecasting
- Engineering of major facilities in the service of oceanography
- Knowledge transfer and innovation in its fields of its activities

In other words, Ifremer's purpose is to:

"Conduct research, innovate, and provide expertise to protect and restore the ocean, sustainably manage marine resources and ecosystems, and share marine data."

== History ==
- In 1985, Ifremer partnered with Dr. Robert Ballard for an ultimately successful expedition to locate the wreck of the RMS Titanic.
- In 1994 Ifremer assisted in the salvage of the cargo from the SS John Barry.
- In 2008, Ifremer partnered with Dr. Bruce Shillito for the testing and initial operations of the PERISCOP, a deep sea fish recovery device.
- In 2023, Ifremer sent the Atalante ship and the Victor 6000 ROV to the rescue operation of the Titan submersible.

== Centres ==
Ifremer is located at 26 sites, including five main centres (Boulogne, Brest, Nantes, Toulon, and Tahiti), with headquarters at Brest. About twenty research departments are associated to these centres.

== Gallery ==
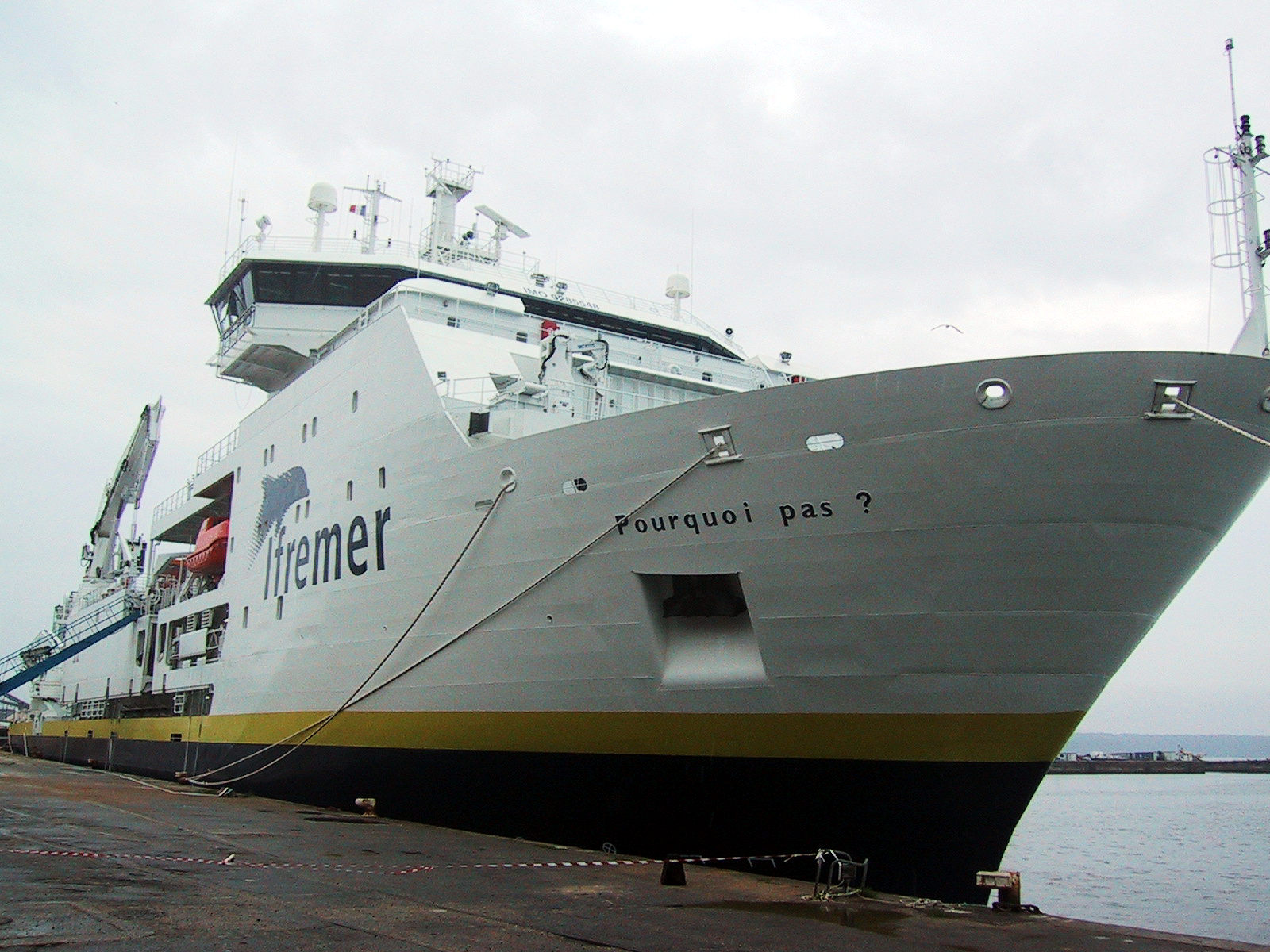
Pourquoi pas ?

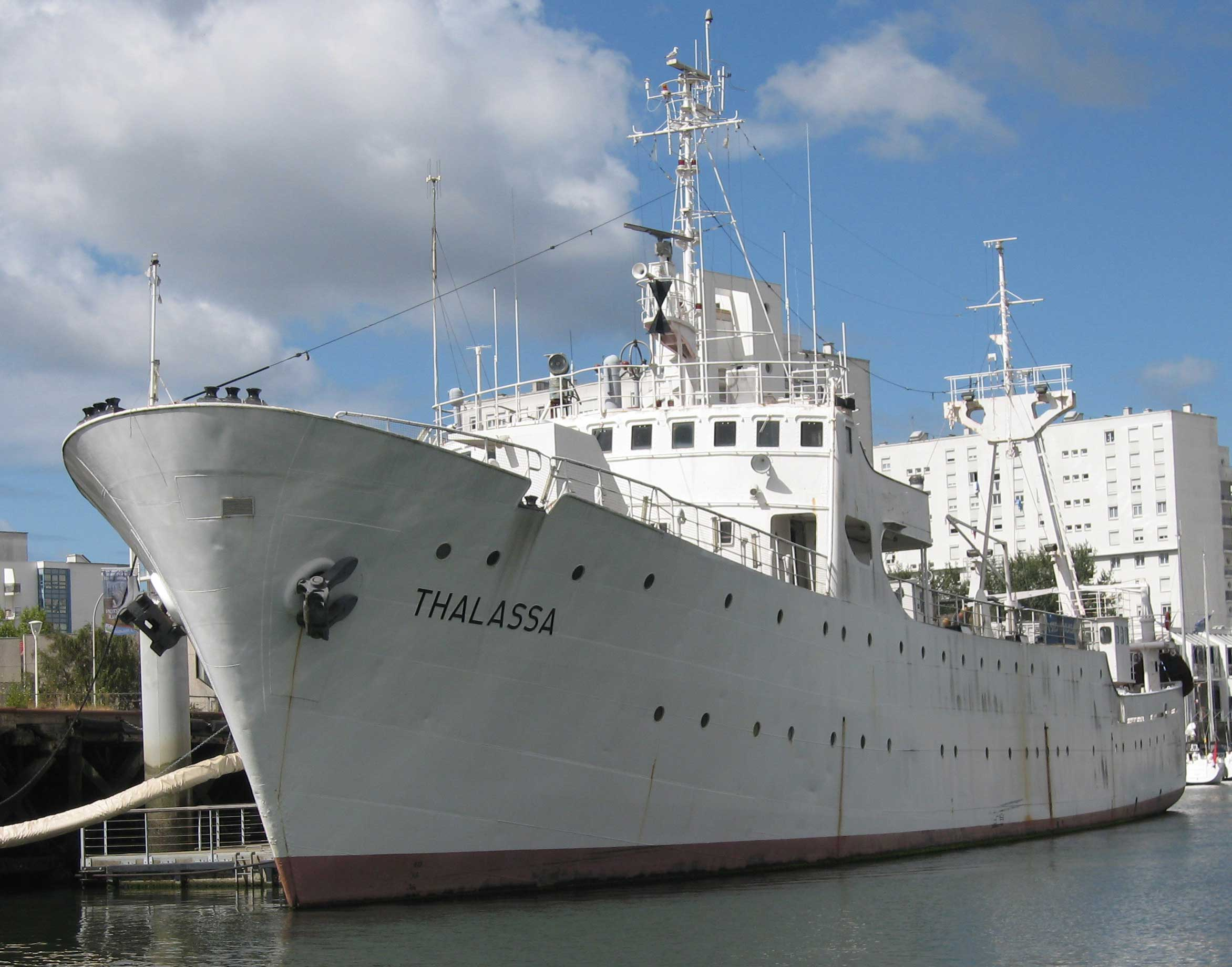
Thalassa

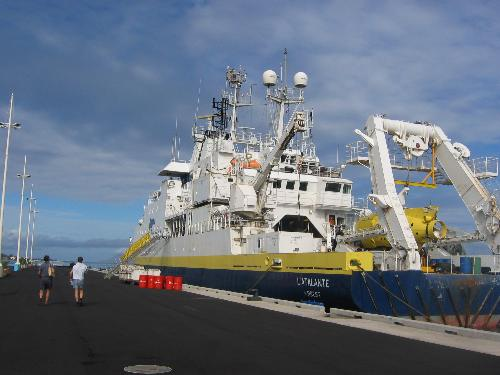
The Atalante in Tahiti

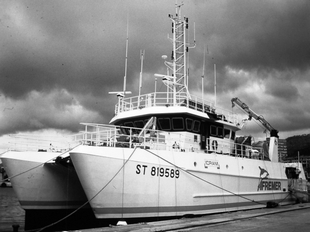
L'Europe, in the Mediterranean, 2012

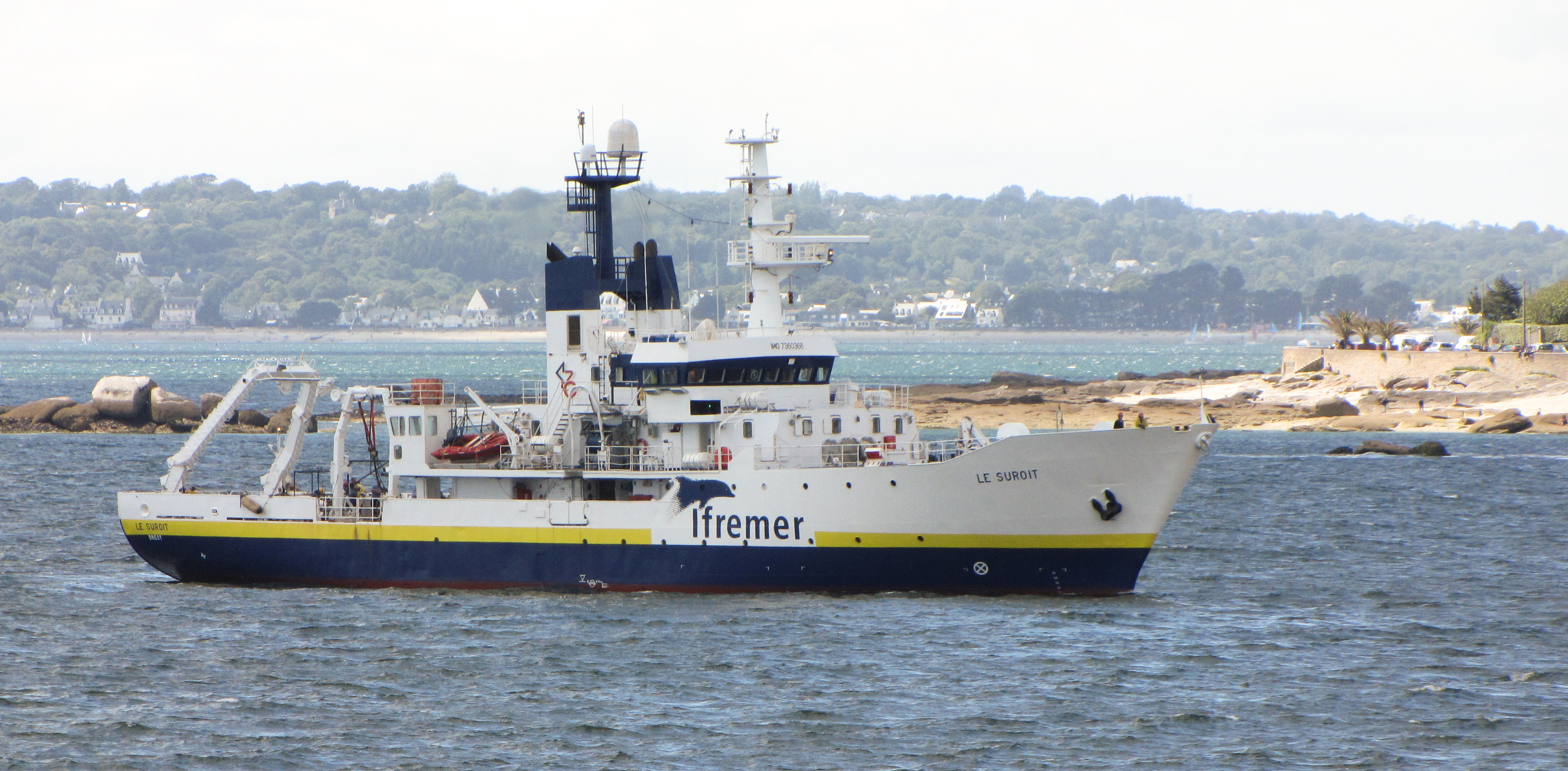
Le Suroît near Concarneau

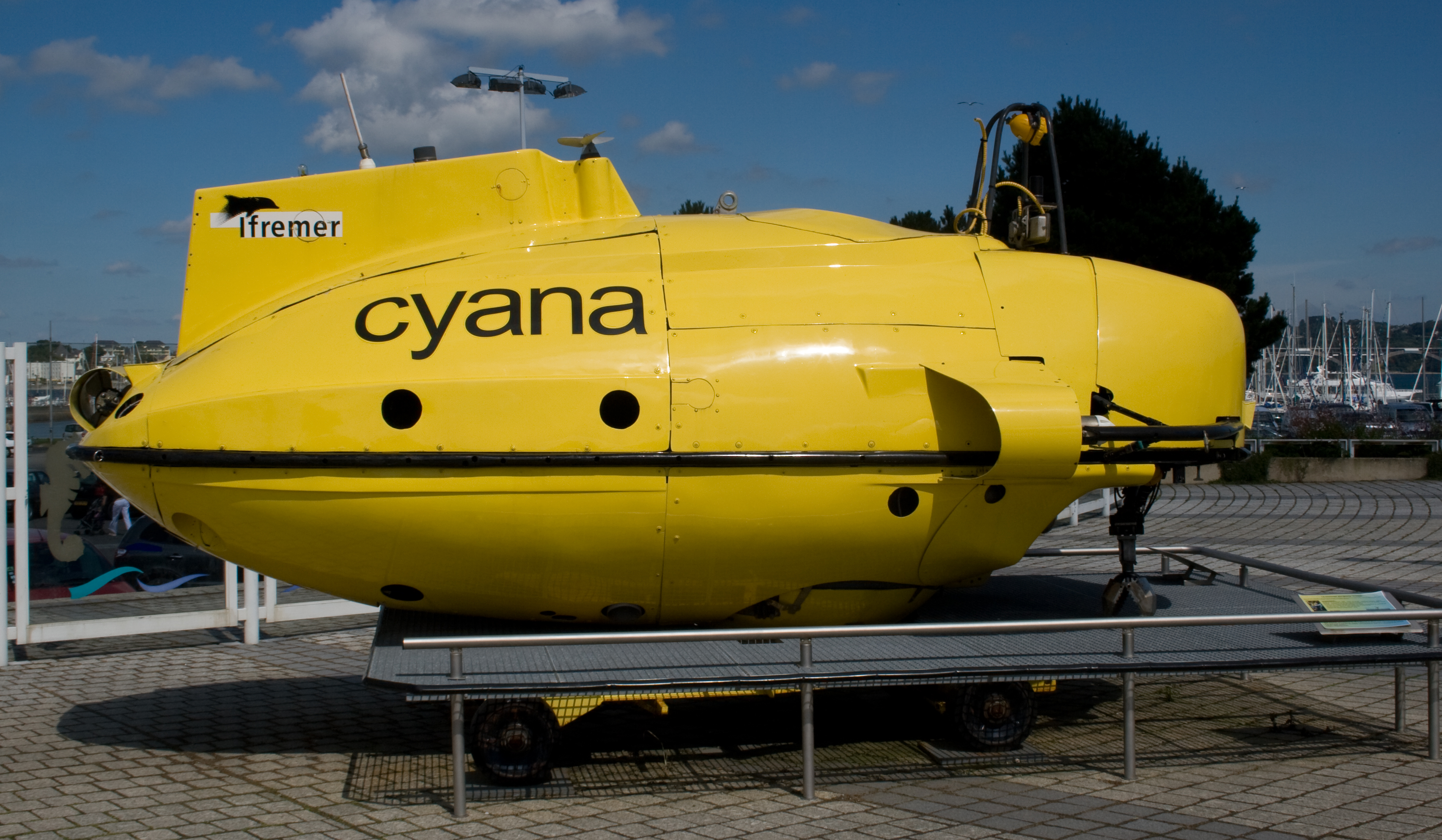
Cyana

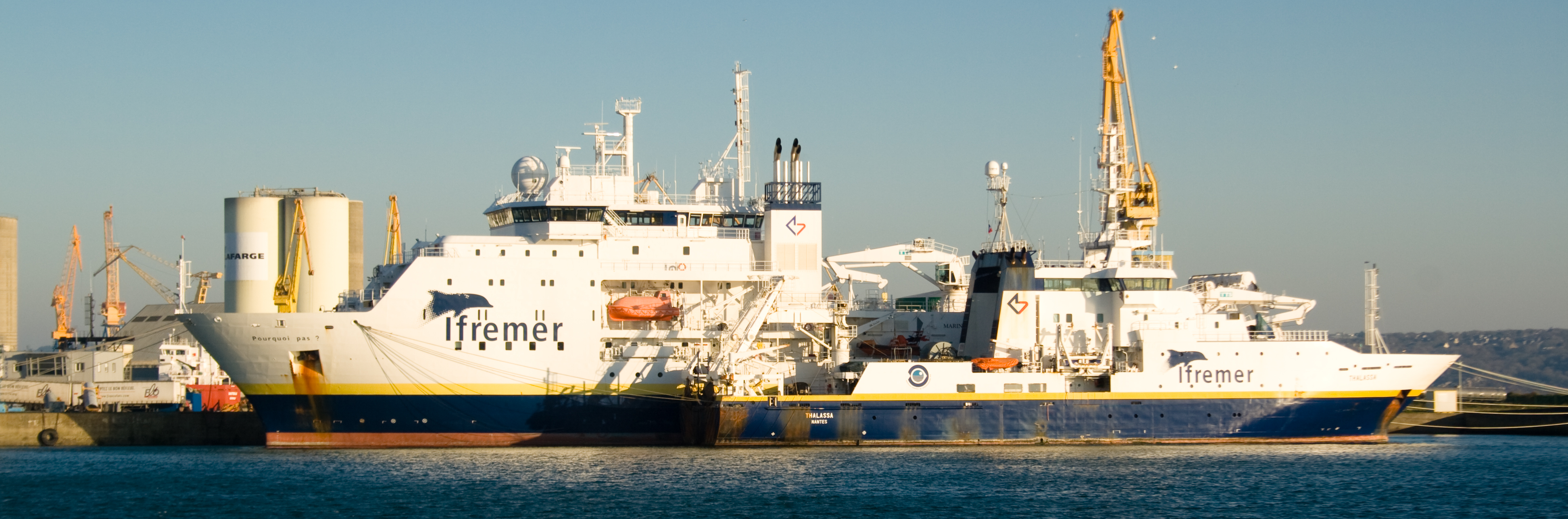
Pourquoi pas ? and Thalassa in Brest harbor
