= Bharat Forecast System =

Weather prediction system

Bharat Forecasting System (BFS)
- Product type: High-resolution Weather forecasting system
- Current owner: Ministry of Earth Sciences
- Produced by: India Meteorological Department
- Country: India
- Introduced: 26 May 2025; 17 months ago

Bharat Forecasting System (BFS) or Bharat Forecasting System is an Indian high-resolution weather prediction system, launched by the Government of India on 26 May 2025. It was developed by the Indian Institute of Tropical Meteorology, under the Ministry of Earth Sciences. The system operates on a 6-kilometer grid, which improves accuracy for medium and short-range forecasts.

== Overview ==
It aims to enhance the prediction of monsoon patterns, cyclones, and other extreme weather events. The system comes with a forecast accuracy of 30% to 64% and is designed to support disaster management initiatives and agricultural planning across the country.
