= Nautile =

Crewed submersible owned by Ifremer

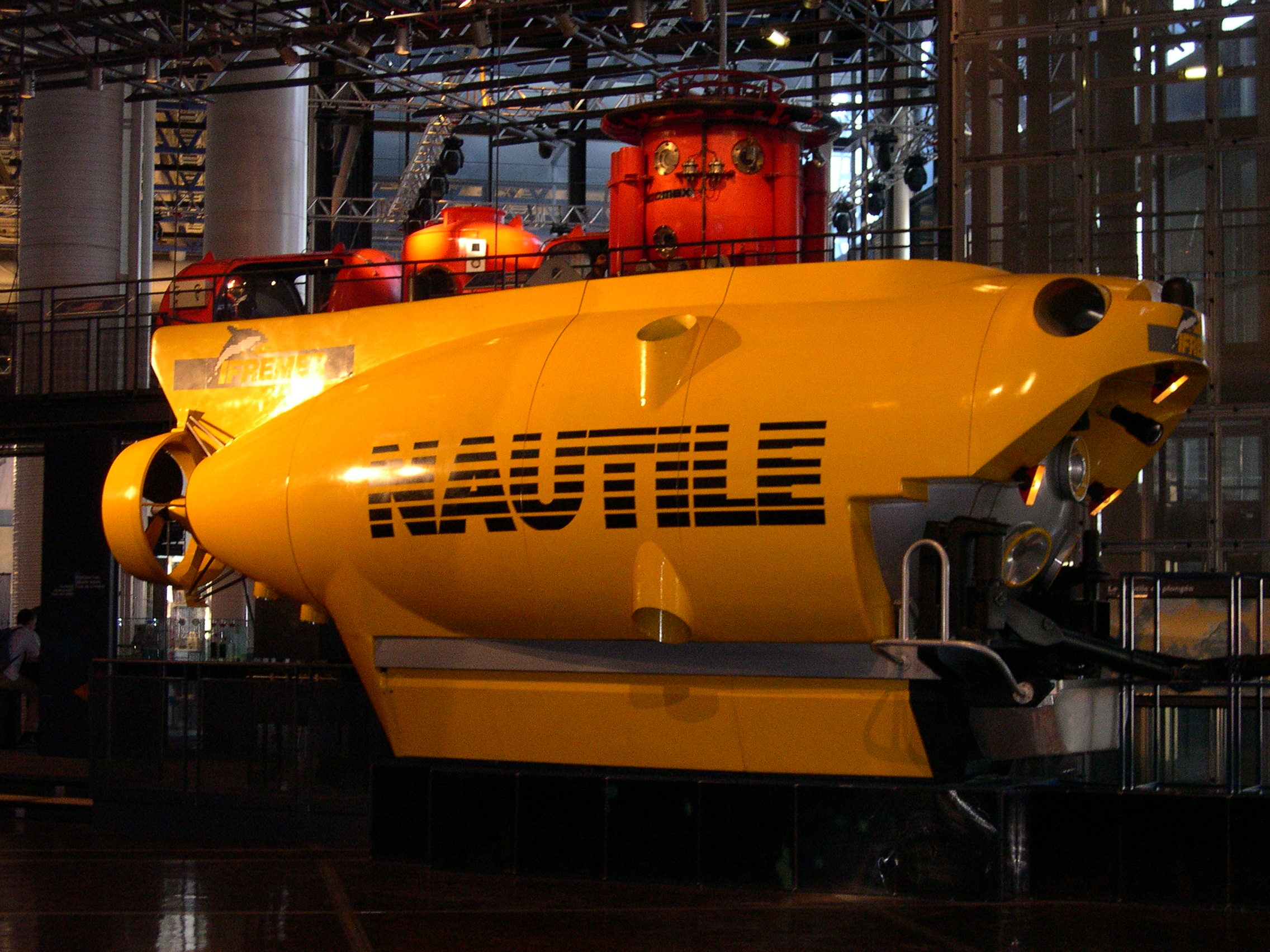
- Nautile

History

France
- Name: Nautile
- Commissioned: 1984
- In service: 1984

General characteristics
- Type: Deep-submergence vehicle
- Length: 8.0 m (26.2 ft)
- Beam: 2.7 m (8.9 ft)
- Draft: 3.81 m (12.5 ft)
- Installed power: Electric motor
- Speed: 1.5kn
- Range: 7.5km
- Endurance: 120h
- Test depth: 6,000 m (20,000 ft)
- Complement: 3

Nautile is a crewed submersible owned by Ifremer, the French Research Institute for Exploitation of the Sea. Commissioned in 1984, the submersible can be operated at depths of up to 6 km (3.7 mi).

== Features ==
Nautile is capable of housing three people. It has a length of 8 m, still imaging cameras, two colour video cameras, and a number of LED floodlights. It is fitted with two robotic arms to allow remote manipulation. This makes it easier to inspect, image, and gather materials from areas otherwise unaccesible to the vehicle. Nautile can stay underwater for up to eight hours at a time. Six of those hours can include work on the sea floor.

Two ships can act as mothership to Nautile: Pourquoi Pas? and Atalante. In its early days, Nautile was launched from RV Nadir.

== Uses ==
Without the need for a physical link to support its operation, the submersible can be readily deployed in a variety of environments. It's most commonly used to survey specific areas, collect samples, and assist in the investigation and recovery of wrecks.

The vessel has been used to examine the wrecks of the RMS Titanic and MV Prestige, and to search for the black boxes from Air France Flight 447

During the inspection of the Titanic, it used a small manipulator arm known as "ROBIN" to retrieve numerous artifacts. Equipped with CCD type cameras, ROBIN is only 60 x 50 x 50 cm large and weighs 130 kg. In August 1987, a 54-days expedition collected new images, videos, and objects from the wreck.

Nautile was used to train Indian Aquanauts under a diplomatic arrangement as a precursor to India's development of Matsya-6000.

== See also ==
- RMS Titanic
- Submersible
- Oceanography
