= Victor 6000 =

French deep-water remotely operated vehicle

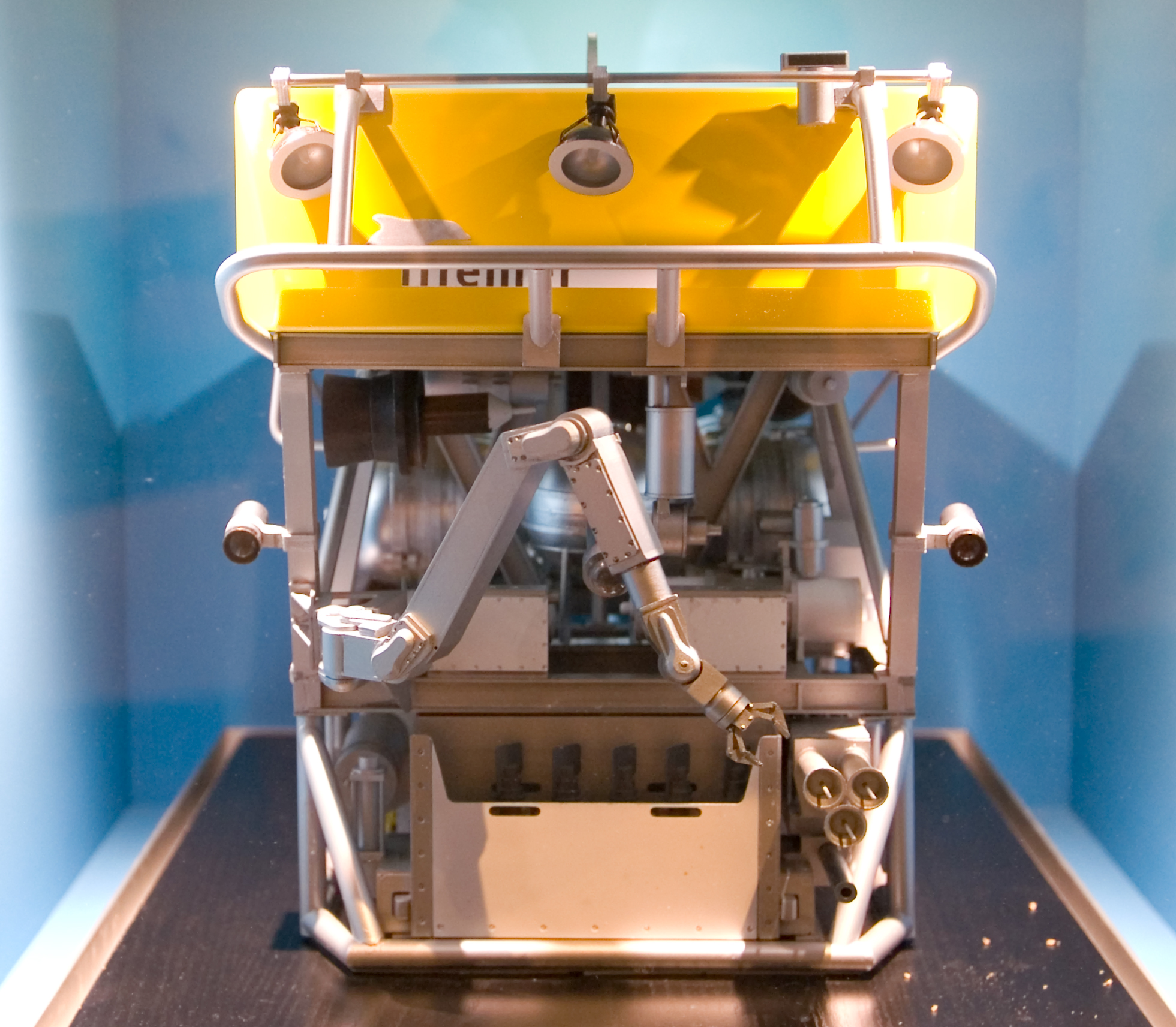
A 1/10 scale model of Victor 6000 at the Musée national de la Marine

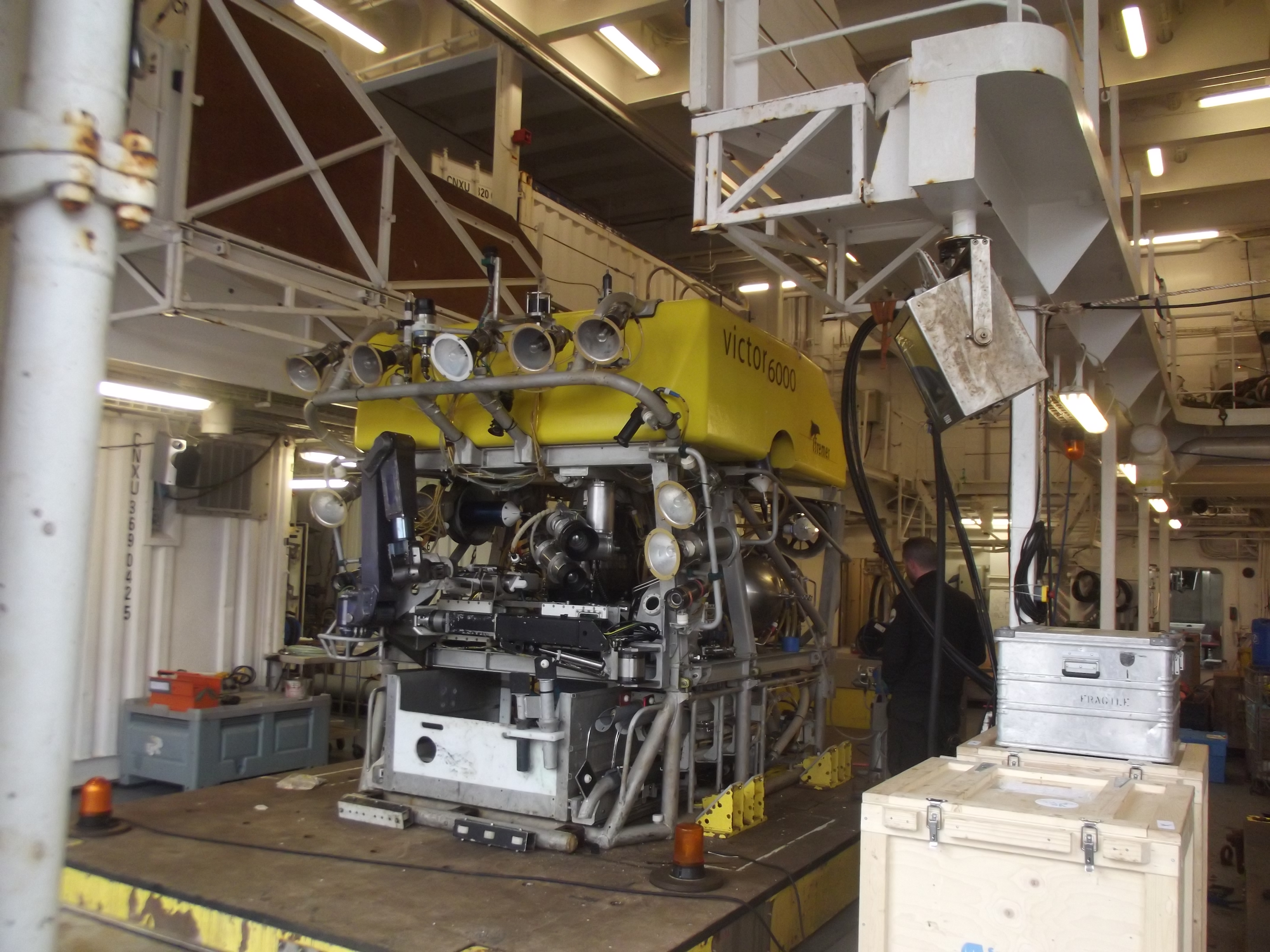
Victor 6000 in the hangar of RV Pourquoi Pas ? in 2014

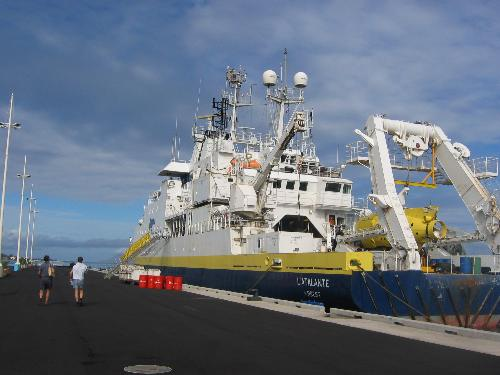
Atalante in 2004

Victor 6000 is a deep-water remotely operated vehicle (ROV) operated by the French Research Institute for Exploitation of the Sea (IFREMER). In service since 1999, it can reach depths up to 6,000 m (20,000 ft).

== Design ==
Victor 6000 is a remotely operated underwater vehicle (ROV) that weighs 4.6 t (4.5 long tons; 5.1 short tons) and measures 3.07 m (10.1 ft) long, 2.77 m (9 ft 1 in) high, and 2.14 m (7 ft 0 in) wide. It is capable of reaching depths of 6,000 m (20,000 ft). Victor 6000 is controlled and powered via a 8.5 km (5.3 mi) cable that connects it to its host ship, but can operate autonomously for 100 hours.

== Operational history ==
From 30 April to 3 June 2002, Victor 6000, aboard the IFREMER research ship Atalante, participated in the PHARE (Peuplements hydrothermaux, leurs associations et relations avec l'environnement) oceanographic campaign and featured in a documentary about the expedition by Jean-François Ternay.

The fauna on display in the Abyss Box pressurised deep sea tank at Oceanopolis aquarium in Brest since 2012 were collected by Victor 6000.

During a scientific expedition with the IFREMER research ship Pourquoi Pas? in November 2020, Victor 6000 was used to discover a SNCASE Aquilon jet fighter-bomber, missing since 1960, at a depth of 2,400 m (7,900 ft) to the south of Porquerolles, France.

In 2023, Victor 6000 and Atalante were used in a rescue attempt in the search for the Titan submersible.
