= French ship Pourquoi Pas? (2005) =

French vessel

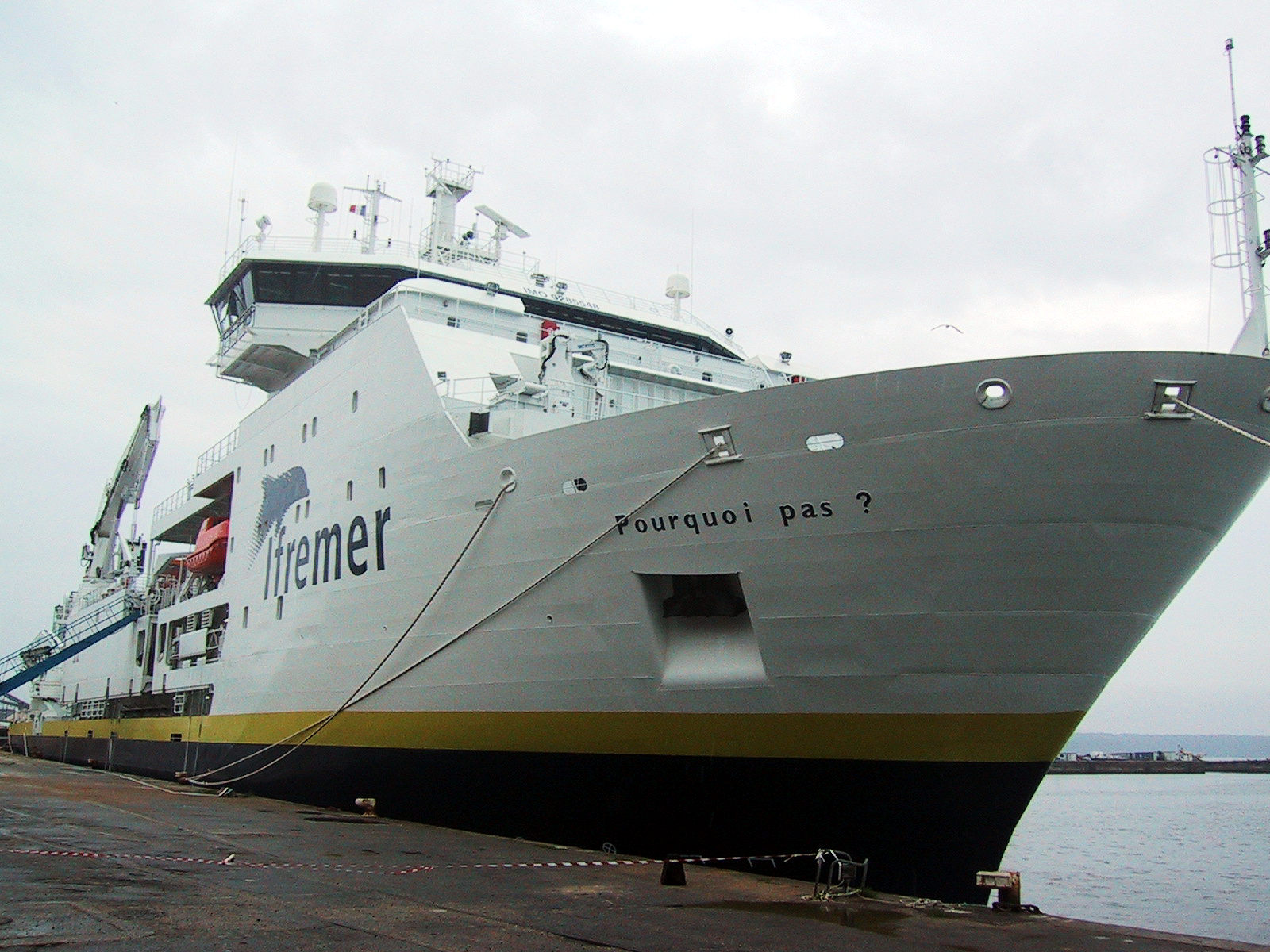
- Pourquoi Pas ? in Brest after her delivery

History

France
- Namesake: Pourquoi Pas ? IV
- Launched: 14 October 2004
- Identification: IMO number: 9285548; MMSI number: 228207600; Callsign: FMCY
- Status: Active as of 2025

General characteristics
- Class & type: research vessel
- Displacement: 6600 tonnes
- Length: 107 m (351 ft)
- Beam: 20 m (66 ft)
- Draught: 6.9 m (23 ft)
- Propulsion: Diesel-electric with a Class II dynamic positioning system.
- Speed: 14.5 knots (26.9 km/h; 16.7 mph)
- Endurance: 64 days at 11 knots
- Boats & landing craft carried: ROV
- Capacity: 1000 m² laboratory, 40 scientists
- Complement: 18 to 33 men
- Sensors & processing systems: Dual multibeam sonars capable of mapping seafloor up to 6000 metre depth with a swath width of up to 20 km; 2 Acoustic Doppler Current Profilers (ADCPs) capable of measuring currents at depth of up to 1000 metres; Sub-bottom profiler for study of the upper layers of seafloor sediment

Pourquoi Pas ? (French pronunciation: [puʁkwa pa]; English: Why Not?) is a research vessel built in Saint-Nazaire, France by Alstom Marine for IFREMER and the French Navy and primarily used by Service hydrographique et océanographique de la Marine (SHOM). Pourquoi Pas ? was ordered in December 2002 and completed in July 2005. The 66 million euro cost was financed by IFREMER (55%) and the French Navy (45%).

== Name ==
She is named after explorer Jean-Baptiste Charcot's famous ship. A space is required immediately before a question mark in French orthography, and accordingly, in French Pourquoi Pas ? is the correct way to write the name.

== Use ==
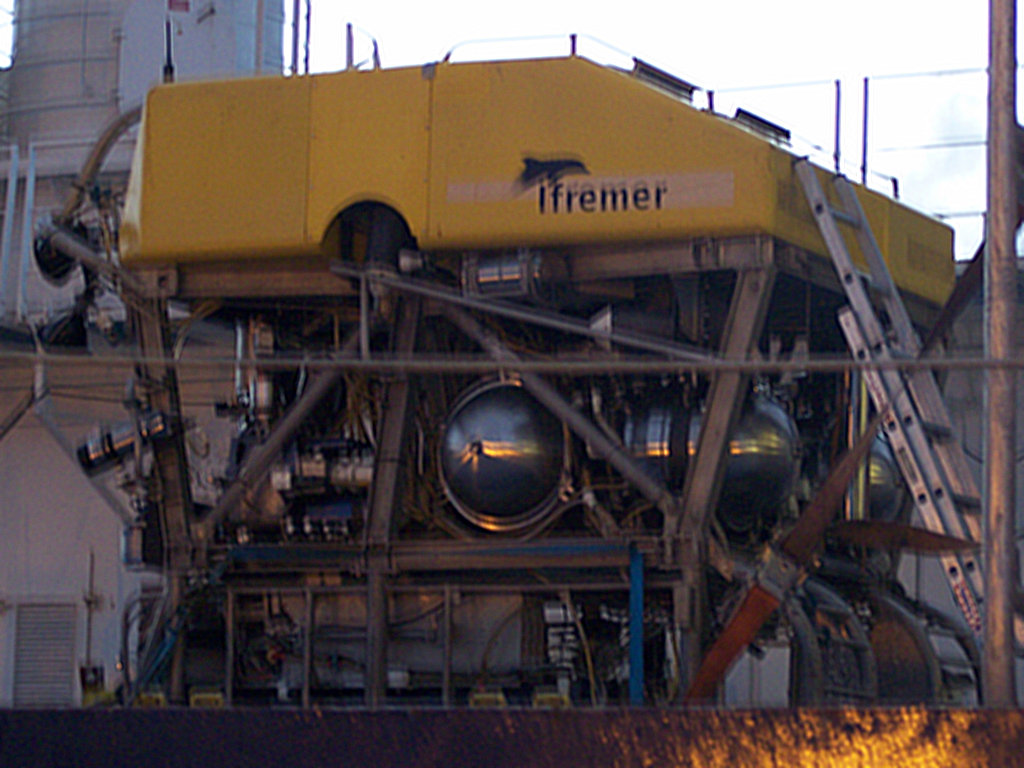
An ROV aboard the Pourquoi Pas ?

Pourquoi Pas ? is used on average 130 days per year by the French Navy and the rest by IFREMER. It was designed for hydrography, geoscience, and physical, chemical, and biological oceanography, as well as to launch small submarines such as the crewed submersible Nautile and the ROV Victor 6000. Since 2010, the ship has been used in a series of annual cruises MoMARSAT maintaining the EMSO-Azores observatory at the Lucky Strike hydrothermal field.

== Notable missions ==
Pourquoi Pas ? has been used for the 2007 deployment and connection operations for the ANTARES neutrino telescope. In 2008, Pourquoi Pas ? was used for the initial testing and operations of the PERISCOP, a pressurized deep sea fish recovery device. In June 2009, she was used to assist the recovery of Air France Flight 447. In November 2020, the ship was used to find the wreckage of an Aquilon fighter jet that had disappeared in June 1960. In April 2024, scientists on board the Pourquoi Pas ? discovered 6 new seamounts in the North Pacific off Mexico. In 2026, it helped located barrels of nuclear waste that had been abandoned in the Atlantic Ocean.
