= Deep-sea community =

Groups of organisms living deep below the sea surface, sharing a habitat

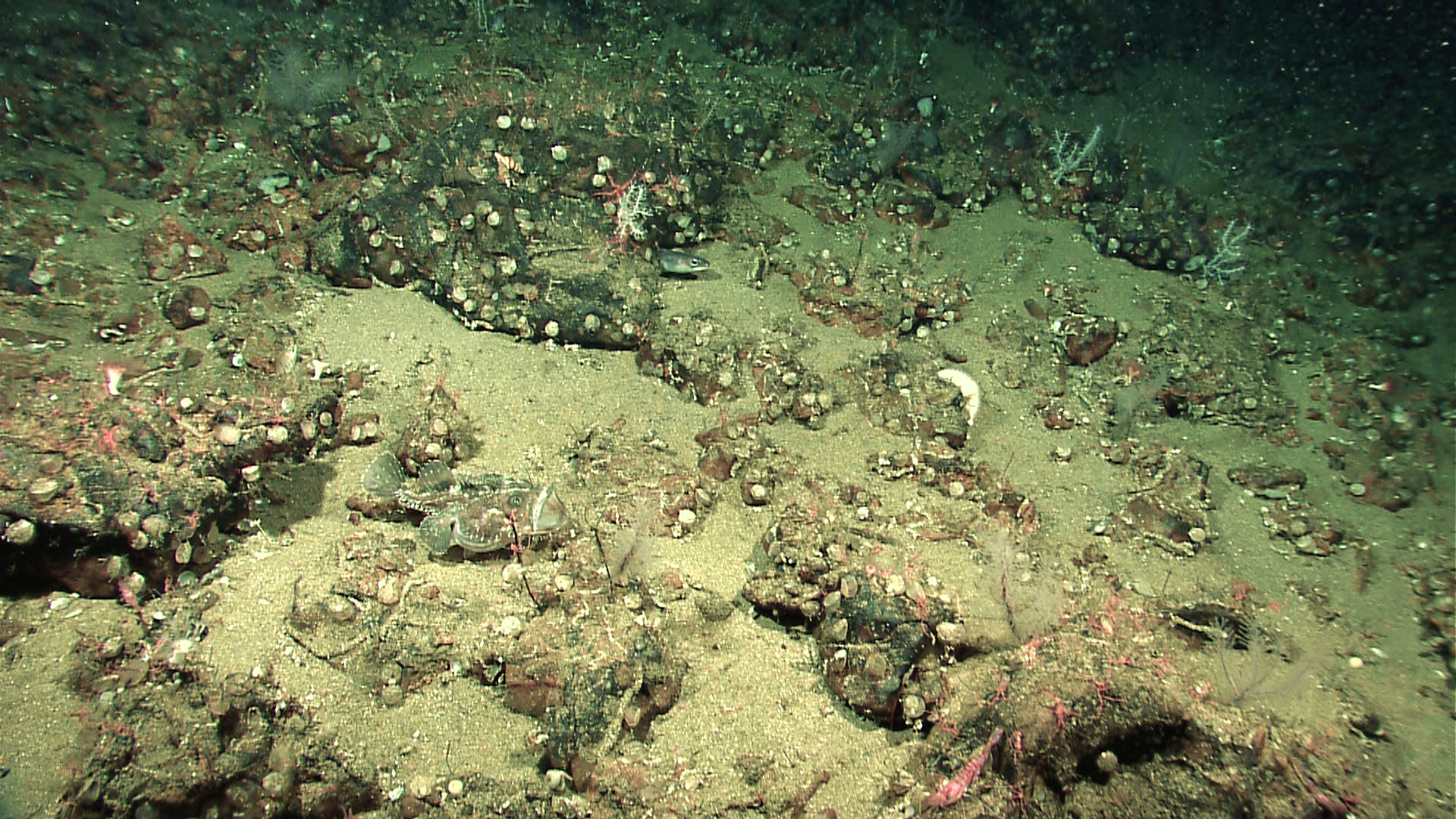
A variety of deep-sea animals on the seabed

A deep-sea community is any community of organisms associated with a shared habitat in the deep sea. Deep sea communities remain largely unexplored, due to the technological and logistical challenges and expense involved in visiting this remote biome. Because of the unique challenges (particularly the high barometric pressure, extremes of temperature, and absence of light), it was long believed that little life existed in this hostile environment. Since the 19th century however, research has demonstrated that significant biodiversity exists in the deep sea.

The three main sources of energy and nutrients for deep sea communities are marine snow, whale falls, and chemosynthesis at hydrothermal vents and cold seeps.

== History ==
Prior to the 19th century scientists assumed life was sparse in the deep ocean. In the 1870s Sir Charles Wyville Thomson and colleagues aboard the Challenger expedition discovered many deep-sea creatures of widely varying types.

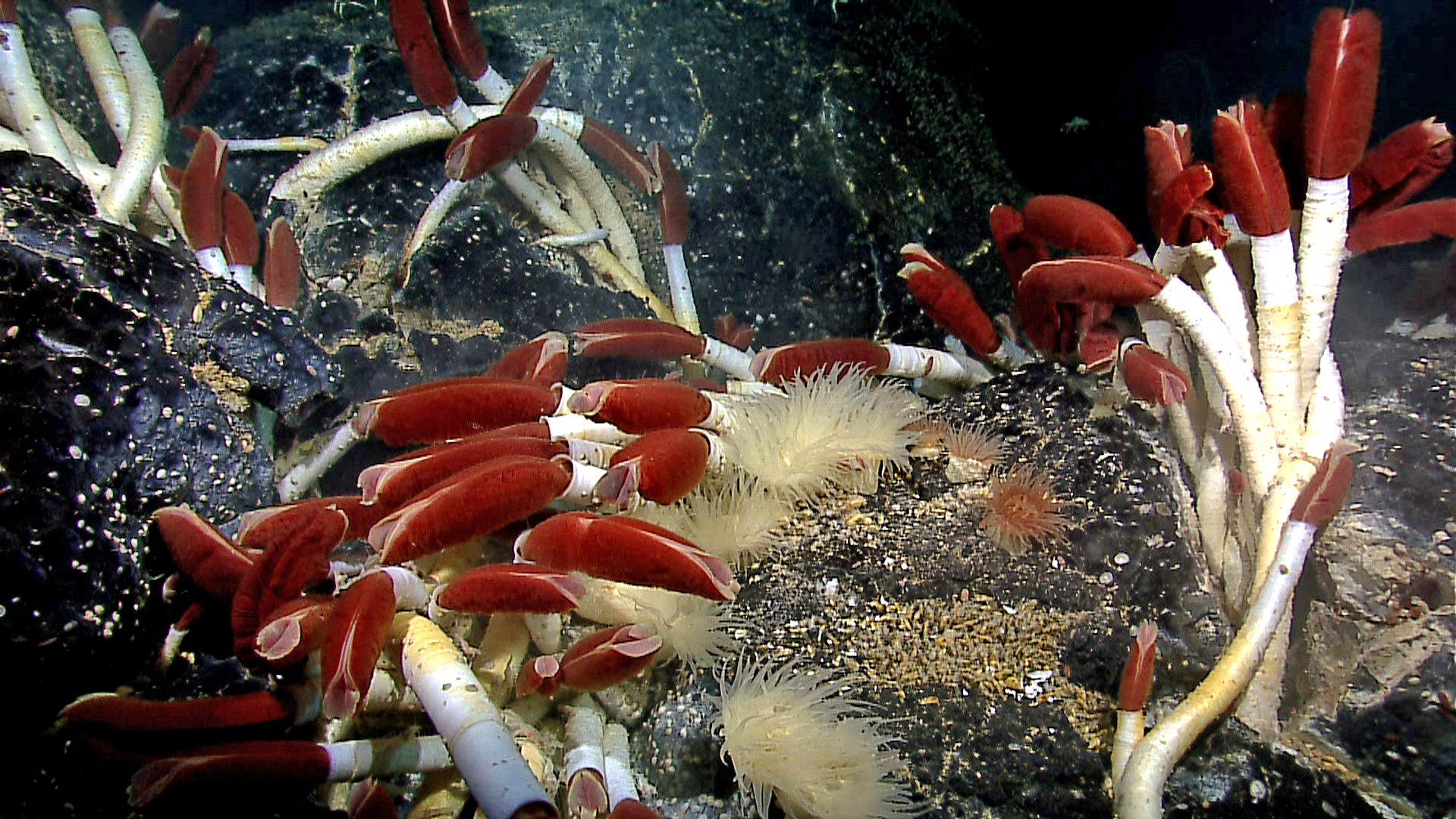
Giant tube worms, which rely on hydrothermal vents to survive

The first discovery of any deep-sea chemosynthetic community including higher animals was unexpectedly made at hydrothermal vents in the eastern Pacific Ocean during geological explorations (Corliss et al., 1979). Two scientists, J. Corliss and J. van Andel, first witnessed dense chemosynthetic clam beds from the submersible DSV Alvin on February 17, 1977, after their unanticipated discovery using a remote camera sled two days before.

The Challenger Deep is the deepest surveyed point of all of Earth's oceans; it is located at the southern end of the Mariana Trench near the Mariana Islands group. The depression is named after HMS Challenger, whose researchers made the first recordings of its depth on 23 March 1875 at station 225. The reported depth was 4,475 fathoms (8184 meters) based on two separate soundings. In 1960, Don Walsh and Jacques Piccard descended to the bottom of the Challenger Deep in the Trieste bathyscaphe. At this great depth a small flounder-like fish was seen moving away from the spotlight of the bathyscaphe.

The Japanese remote operated vehicle (ROV) Kaiko became the second vessel to reach the bottom of the Challenger Deep in March 1995. Nereus, a hybrid remotely operated vehicle (HROV) of the Woods Hole Oceanographic Institution, is the only vehicle capable of exploring ocean depths beyond 7000 meters. Nereus reached a depth of 10,902 meters at the Challenger Deep on May 31, 2009. On 1 June 2009, sonar mapping of the Challenger Deep by the Simrad EM120 multibeam sonar bathymetry system aboard the R/V Kilo Moana indicated a maximum depth of 10,971 meters (6.817 miles). The sonar system uses phase and amplitude bottom detection, with an accuracy of better than 0.2% of water depth (this is an error of about 22 meters at this depth).

== Evolution ==
Three hypotheses exist about the evolution of deep sea life. The first, poorly supported by fossil evidence showing significant deep sea communities during the late Palaeozoic and early Mesozoic, is that the deep sea was largely uninhabited and azoic until the Cretaceous period. The second is that the deep sea has been successively colonised multiple times over the Phanerozoic and that biotic successions have occurred there since the Cambrian, and that faunal turnovers were particularly significant during the Cretaceous oceanic anoxic events (OAEs). The third is that the deep sea has served as a refuge from mass extinction events and is a bastion of relicts that have continuously inhabited the deep sea with relatively minimal occurrences of biotic turnovers.

== Environment ==
=== Darkness ===
Pelagic zones

The ocean can be conceptualized as being divided into various zones, depending on depth, and the presence or absence of sunlight. Nearly all life forms in the ocean depend on the photosynthetic activities of phytoplankton and other marine plants to convert carbon dioxide into organic carbon, which is the basic building block of organic matter. Photosynthesis in turn requires energy from sunlight to drive the chemical reactions that produce organic carbon.

The stratum of the water column up to which sunlight penetrates is referred to as the photic zone. The photic zone can be subdivided into two different vertical regions. The uppermost portion of the photic zone, where there is adequate light to support photosynthesis by phytoplankton and plants, is referred to as the euphotic zone (also referred to as the epipelagic zone, or surface zone). The lower portion of the photic zone, where the light intensity is insufficient for photosynthesis, is called the dysphotic zone (dysphotic means "poorly lit" in Greek). The dysphotic zone is also referred to as the mesopelagic zone, or the twilight zone. Its lowermost boundary is at a thermocline of 12 °C (54 °F), which, in the tropics generally lies between 200 and 1000 meters.

The euphotic zone is somewhat arbitrarily defined as extending from the surface to the depth where the light intensity is approximately 0.1–1% of surface sunlight irradiance, depending on season, latitude and degree of water turbidity. In the clearest ocean water, the euphotic zone may extend to a depth of about 150 meters, or rarely, up to 200 meters. Dissolved substances and solid particles absorb and scatter light, and in coastal regions the high concentration of these substances causes light to be attenuated rapidly with depth. In such areas the euphotic zone may be only a few tens of meters deep or less. The dysphotic zone, where light intensity is considerably less than 1% of surface irradiance, extends from the base of the euphotic zone to about 1000 meters. Extending from the bottom of the photic zone down to the seabed is the aphotic zone, a region of perpetual darkness.

Since the average depth of the ocean is about 3688 meters, the photic zone represents only a tiny fraction of the ocean's total volume. However, due to its capacity for photosynthesis, the photic zone has the greatest biodiversity and biomass of all oceanic zones. Nearly all primary production in the ocean occurs here. Any life forms present in the aphotic zone must either be capable of movement upwards through the water column into the photic zone for feeding, or must rely on material sinking from above, or must find another source of energy and nutrition, such as occurs in chemosynthetic archaea found near hydrothermal vents and cold seeps.

=== Hyperbaricity ===
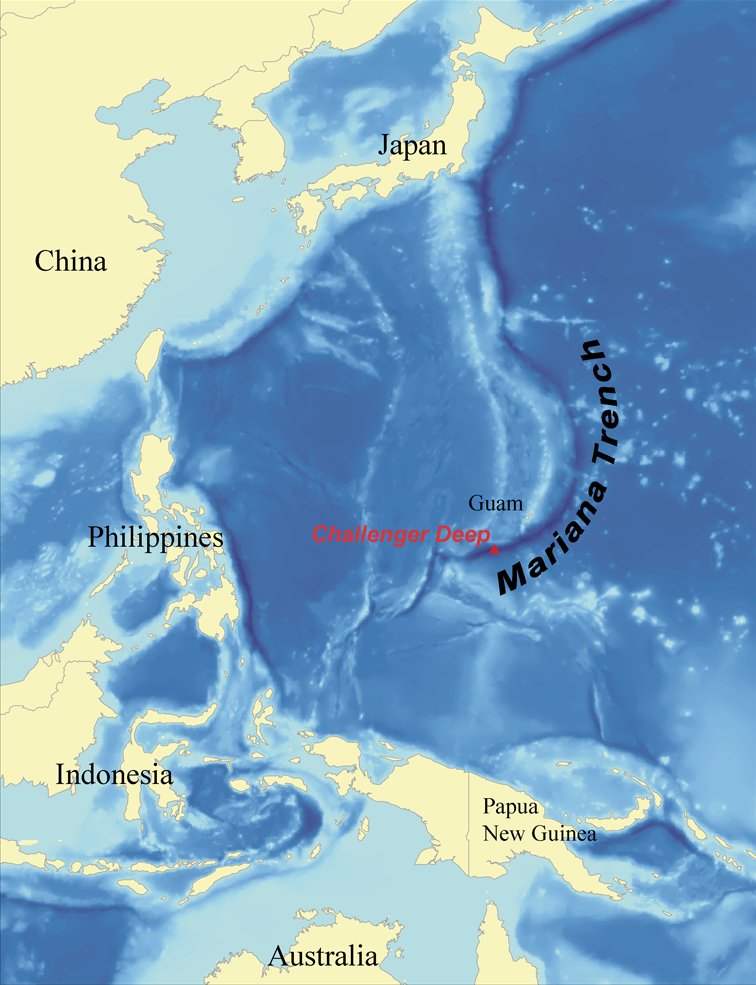
Location of the Challenger Deep in the Mariana Trench

These animals have evolved to survive the extreme pressure of the sub-photic zones. The pressure increases by about one atmosphere every ten meters. To cope with the pressure, many fish are rather small, usually not exceeding 25 cm in length. Also, scientists have discovered that the deeper these creatures live, the more gelatinous their flesh and more minimal their skeletal structure. These creatures have also eliminated all excess cavities that would collapse under the pressure, such as swim bladders.

Pressure is the greatest environmental factor acting on deep-sea organisms. In the deep sea, although most of the deep sea is under pressures between 200 and 600 atm, the range of pressure is from 20 to 1,000 atm. Pressure exhibits a great role in the distribution of deep sea organisms. Until recently, people lacked detailed information on the direct effects of pressure on most deep-sea organisms, because virtually all organisms trawled from the deep sea arrived at the surface dead or dying. With the advent of traps that incorporate a special pressure-maintaining chamber, undamaged larger metazoan animals have been retrieved from the deep sea in good condition. Some of these have been maintained for experimental purposes, and we are obtaining more knowledge of the biological effects of pressure.

=== Temperature ===
The two areas of greatest and most rapid temperature change in the oceans are the transition zone between the surface waters and the deep waters, the thermocline, and the transition between the deep-sea floor and the hot water flows at the hydrothermal vents. Thermoclines vary in thickness from a few hundred meters to nearly a thousand meters. Below the thermocline, the water mass of the deep ocean is cold and far more homogeneous. Thermoclines are strongest in the tropics, where the temperature of the epipelagic zone is usually above 20 °C. From the base of the epipelagic, the temperature drops over several hundred meters to 5 or 6 °C at 1,000 meters. It continues to decrease to the bottom, but the rate is much slower. Below 3,000 to 4,000 m, the water is isothermal. At any given depth, the temperature is practically unvarying over long periods of time. There are no seasonal temperature changes, nor are there any annual changes. No other habitat on earth has such a constant temperature.

Hydrothermal vents are the direct contrast with constant temperature. In these systems, the temperature of the water as it emerges from the "black smoker" chimneys may be as high as 400 °C (it is kept from boiling by the high hydrostatic pressure) while within a few meters it may be back down to 2–4 °C.

=== Salinity ===
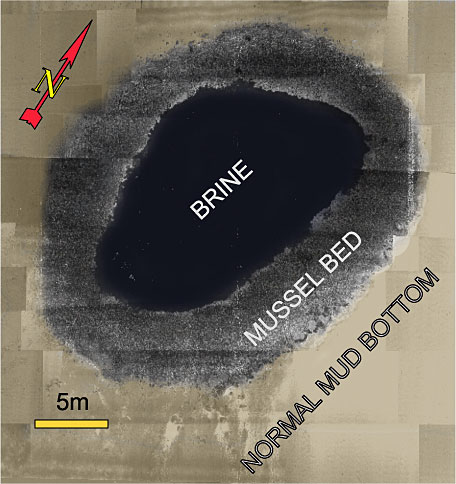
NOAA rendering of a brine pool in the Gulf of Mexico

Salinity is constant throughout the depths of the deep sea. There are two notable exceptions to this rule:

1. In the Mediterranean Sea, water loss through evaporation greatly exceeds input from precipitation and river runoff. Because of this, salinity in the Mediterranean is higher than in the Atlantic Ocean. Evaporation is especially high in its eastern half, causing the water level to decrease and salinity to increase in this area. The resulting pressure gradient pushes relatively cool, low-salinity water from the Atlantic Ocean across the basin. This water warms and becomes saltier as it travels eastward, then sinks in the region of the Levant and circulates westward, to spill back into the Atlantic over the Strait of Gibraltar. The net effect of this is that at the Strait of Gibraltar, there is an eastward surface current of cold water of lower salinity from the Atlantic, and a simultaneous westward current of warm saline water from the Mediterranean in the deeper zones. Once back in the Atlantic, this chemically distinct Mediterranean Intermediate Water can persist for thousands of kilometers away from its source.
2. Brine pools are large areas of brine on the seabed. These pools are bodies of water that have a salinity that is three to five times greater than that of the surrounding ocean. For deep sea brine pools the source of the salt is the dissolution of large salt deposits through salt tectonics. The brine often contains high concentrations of methane, providing energy to chemosynthetic extremophiles that live in this specialized biome. Brine pools are also known to exist on the Antarctic continental shelf where the source of brine is salt excluded during formation of sea ice. Deep sea and Antarctic brine pools can be toxic to marine animals. Brine pools are sometimes called seafloor lakes because the dense brine creates a halocline which does not easily mix with overlying seawater. The high salinity raises the density of the brine, which creates a distinct surface and shoreline for the pool.

The deep sea, or deep layer, is the lowest layer in the ocean, existing below the thermocline, at a depth of 1,000 fathoms (1,800 m) or more. The deepest part of the deep sea is Mariana Trench located in the western North Pacific. It is also the deepest point of the Earth's crust. It has a maximum depth of about 10.9 km which is deeper than the height of Mount Everest. In 1960, Don Walsh and Jacques Piccard reached the bottom of the Mariana Trench in the Trieste bathyscaphe. The pressure is about 11,318 metric tons-force per square meter (110.99 MPa or 16100 psi).

== Zones ==
=== Mesopelagic ===
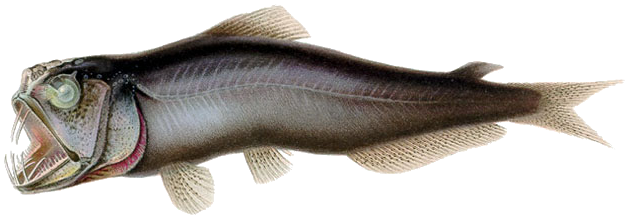
Most mesopelagic fish are ambush predators with upward-facing eyes, like this sabertooth fish.

The mesopelagic zone is the upper section of the midwater zone, and extends from 200 to 1,000 metres (660 to 3,280 ft) below sea level. This is colloquially known as the "twilight zone" as light can still penetrate this layer, but it is too low to support photosynthesis. The limited amount of light, however, can still allow organisms to see, and creatures with a sensitive vision can detect prey, communicate, and orientate themselves using their sight. Organisms in this layer have large eyes to maximize the amount of light in the environment.

Most mesopelagic fish make daily vertical migrations, moving at night into the epipelagic zone, often following similar migrations of zooplankton, and returning to the depths for safety during the day. These vertical migrations often occur over a large vertical distances, and are undertaken with the assistance of a swimbladder. The swimbladder is inflated when the fish wants to move up, and, given the high pressures in the mesopelagic zone, this requires significant energy. As the fish ascends, the pressure in the swimbladder must adjust to prevent it from bursting. When the fish wants to return to the depths, the swimbladder is deflated. Some mesopelagic fishes make daily migrations through the thermocline, where the temperature changes between 10 and 20 °C (18 and 36 °F), thus displaying considerable tolerances for temperature change.

Mesopelagic fish usually lack defensive spines, and use colour and bioluminescence to camouflage them from other fish. Ambush predators are dark, black or red. Since the longer, red, wavelengths of light do not reach the deep sea, red effectively functions the same as black. Migratory forms use countershaded silvery colours. On their bellies, they often display photophores producing low grade light. For a predator from below, looking upwards, this bioluminescence camouflages the silhouette of the fish. However, some of these predators have yellow lenses that filter the (red deficient) ambient light, leaving the bioluminescence visible.

=== Bathyal ===
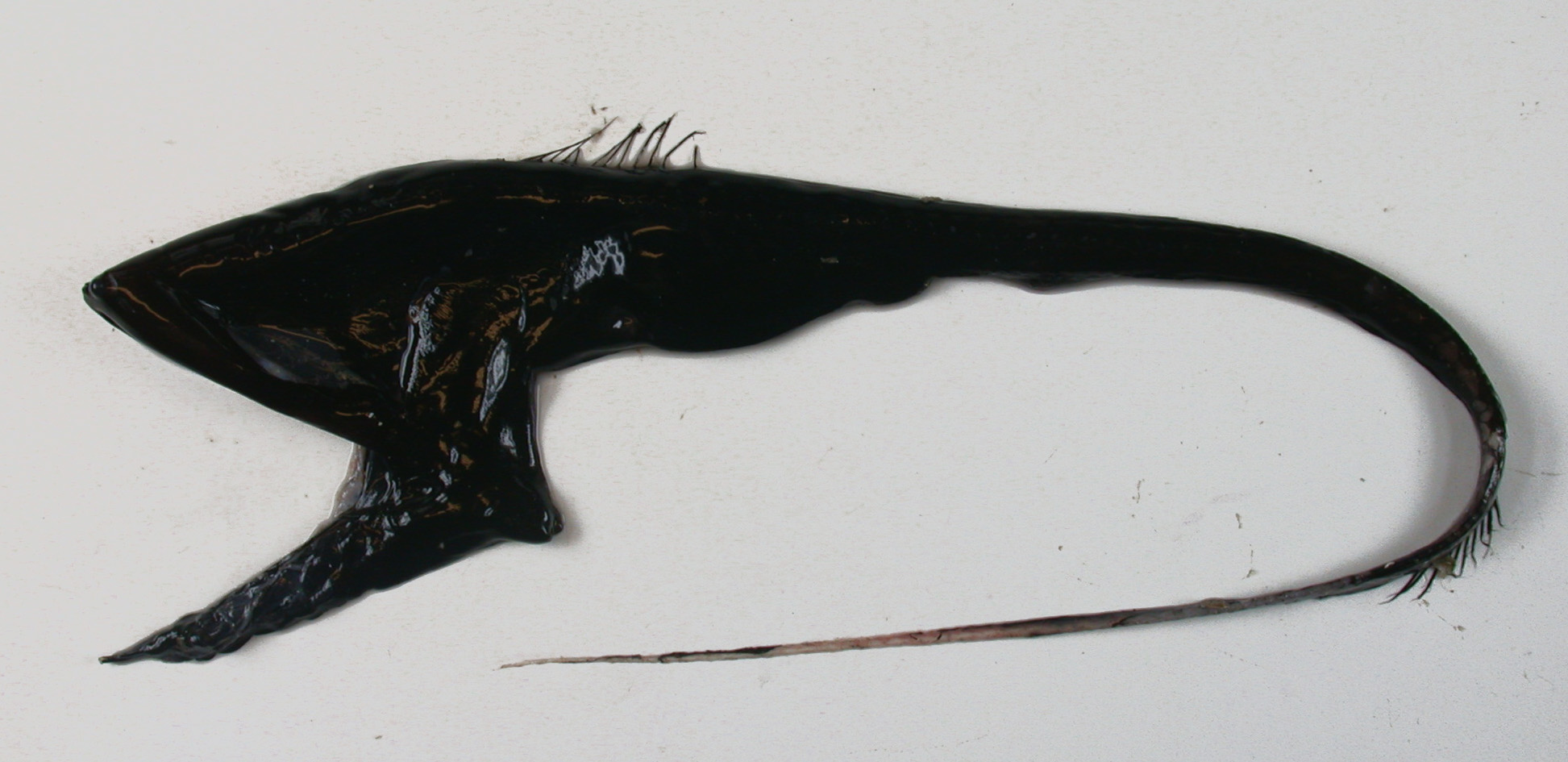
Gulper eels use their mouth like a net to catch prey, and have a bioluminescent tail to attract prey.

The bathyal zone is the lower section of the midwater zone, and encompasses the depths of 1,000 to 4,000 metres (3,300 to 13,100 ft). Light does not reach this zone, giving it its nickname "the midnight zone"; due to the lack of light, it is less densely populated than the epipelagic zone, despite being much larger. Fish find it hard to live in this zone, as there is crushing pressure, cold temperatures of 4 °C (39 °F), a low level of dissolved oxygen, and a lack of sufficient nutrients. What little energy is available in the bathypelagic zone filters from above in the form of detritus, faecal material, and the occasional invertebrate or mesopelagic fish. About 20% of the food that has its origins in the epipelagic zone falls down to the mesopelagic zone, but only about 5% filters down to the bathypelagic zone. The fish that do live there may have reduced or completely lost their gills, kidneys, hearts, and swimbladders, have slimy instead of scaly skin, and have a weak skeletal and muscular build. This lack of ossification is an adaptation to save energy when food is scarce. Most of the animals that live in the bathyal zone are invertebrates such as sea sponges, cephalopods, and echinoderms. With the exception of very deep areas of the ocean, the bathyal zone usually reaches the benthic zone on the seafloor.

=== Abyssal and hadal ===
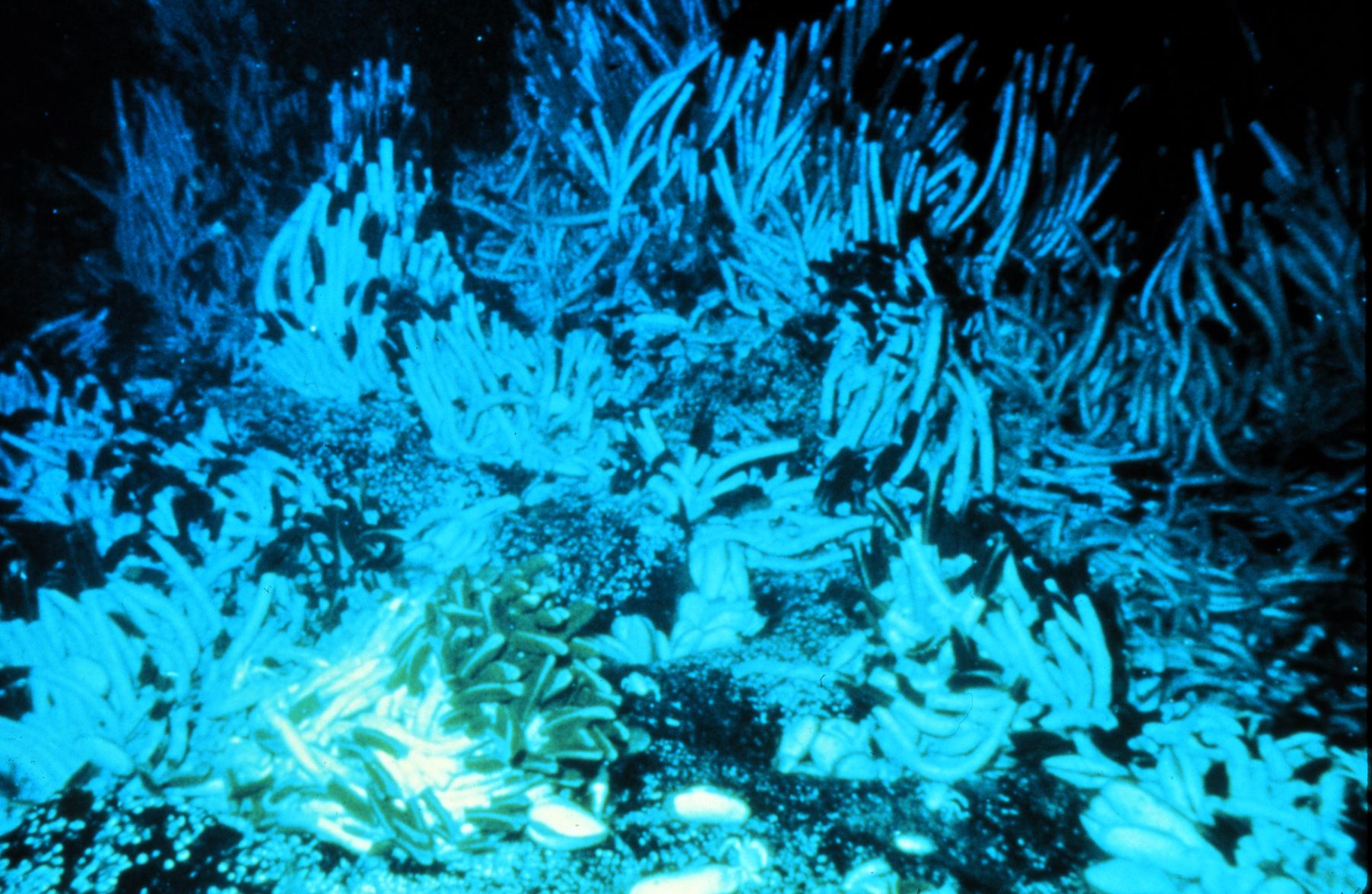
Giant tube worms chemosynthesize near hydrothermal vents

The abyssal zone remains in perpetual darkness at a depth of 4,000 to 6,000 metres (13,000 to 20,000 ft). The only organisms that inhabit this zone are chemotrophs and predators that can withstand immense pressures, sometimes as high as 76 megapascals (750 atm; 11,000 psi). The hadal zone (named after Hades, the Greek god of the underworld) is a zone designated for the deepest trenches in the world, reaching depths of below 6,000 metres (20,000 ft). The deepest point in the hadal zone is the Marianas Trench, which descends to 10,911 metres (35,797 ft) and has a pressure of 110 megapascals (1,100 atm; 16,000 psi).

== Energy sources ==
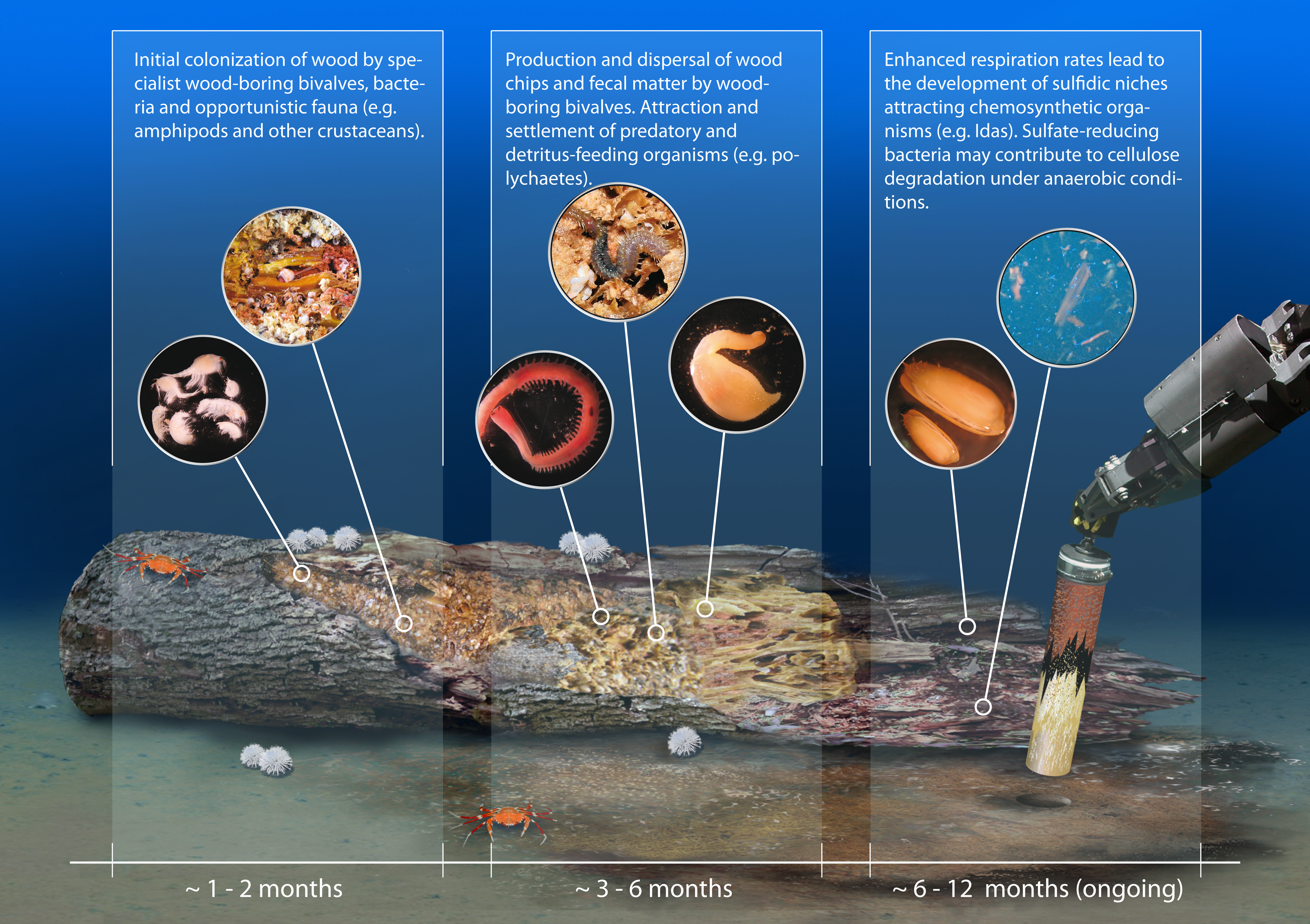
Wood fall as an energy source.

=== Marine snow ===
The upper photic zone of the ocean is filled with particulate organic matter (POM), especially in the coastal areas and the upwelling areas. However, most POM is small and light. It may take hundreds, or even thousands of years for these particles to settle through the water column into the deep ocean. This time delay is long enough for the particles to be remineralized and taken up by organisms in the food web.

In the deep Sargasso Sea, scientists from the Woods Hole Oceanographic Institution (WHOI) found what became known as marine snow in which the POM are repackaged into much larger particles which sink at much greater speed, falling like snow.

Because of the sparsity of food, the organisms living on and in the bottom are generally opportunistic. They have special adaptations for this extreme environment: rapid growth, effect larval dispersal mechanism and the ability to use a 'transient' food resource. One typical example is wood-boring bivalves, which bore into wood and other plant remains and are fed on the organic matter from the remains.

=== Occasional surface blooms ===
Sometimes sudden access to nutrients near the surface leads to blooms of plankton, algae or animals such as salps, which becomes so numerous that they will sink all the way to the bottom without being consumed by other organisms. These short bursts of nutrients reaching the seafloor can exceed years of marine snow, and are rapidly consumed by animals and microbes. The waste products becomes part of the deep-sea sediments, and recycled by animals and microbes that feed on mud for years to come.

=== Whale falls ===
For the deep-sea ecosystem, the death of a whale is the most important event. A dead whale can bring hundreds of tons of organic matter to the bottom. Whale fall community progresses through three stages:

1. Mobile scavenger stage: Big and mobile deep-sea animals arrive at the site almost immediately after whales fall on the bottom. Amphipods, crabs, sleeper sharks and hagfish are all scavengers.
2. Opportunistic stage: Organisms arrive which colonize the bones and surrounding sediments that have been contaminated with organic matter from the carcass and any other tissue left by the scavengers. One genus is Osedax, a tube worm. The larva is born without sex. The surrounding environment determines the sex of the larva. When a larva settles on a whale bone, it turns into a female; when a larva settles on or in a female, it turns into a dwarf male. One female Osedax can carry more than 200 of these male individuals in its oviduct.
3. Sulfophilic stage: Further decomposition of bones and seawater sulfate reduction happen at this stage. Bacteria create a sulphide-rich environment analogous to hydrothermal vents. Polynoids, bivalves, gastropods and other sulphur-loving creatures move in.

=== Chemosynthesis ===
==== Hydrothermal vents ====
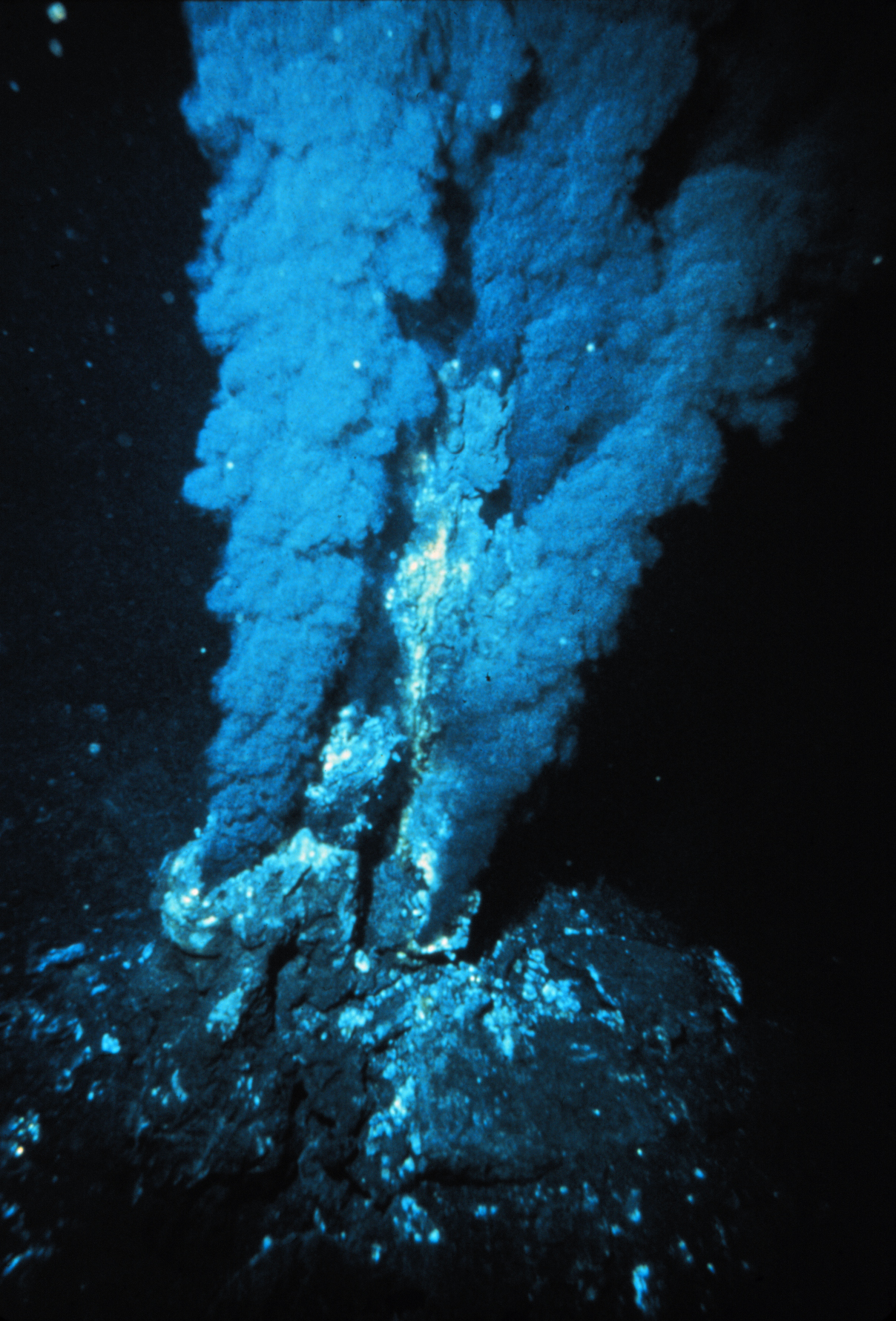
hydrothermal vent

Hydrothermal vents were discovered in 1977 by scientists from Scripps Institution of Oceanography. So far, the discovered hydrothermal vents are all located at the boundaries of plates: East Pacific, California, Mid-Atlantic ridge, China and Japan.

New ocean basin material is being made in regions such as the Mid-Atlantic ridge as tectonic plates pull away from each other. The rate of spreading of plates is 1–5 cm/yr. Cold sea water circulates down through cracks between two plates and heats up as it passes through hot rock. Minerals and sulfides are dissolved into the water during the interaction with rock. Eventually, the hot solutions emanate from an active sub-seafloor rift, creating a hydrothermal vent.

Chemosynthesis of bacteria provide the energy and organic matter for the whole food web in vent ecosystems. These vents spew forth very large amounts of chemicals, which these bacteria can transform into energy. These bacteria can also grow free of a host and create mats of bacteria on the sea floor around hydrothermal vents, where they serve as food for other creatures. Bacteria are a key energy source in the food chain. This source of energy creates large populations in areas around hydrothermal vents, which provides scientists with an easy stop for research. Organisms can also use chemosynthesis to attract prey or to attract a mate. Giant tube worms can grow to 2.4 m (7 ft 10 in) tall because of the richness of nutrients. Over 300 new species have been discovered at hydrothermal vents.

Hydrothermal vents are entire ecosystems independent from sunlight, and may be the first evidence that the earth can support life without the sun.

==== Cold seeps ====
A cold seep (sometimes called a cold vent) is an area of the ocean floor where hydrogen sulfide, methane and other hydrocarbon-rich fluid seepage occurs, often in the form of a brine pool.

== Ecology ==
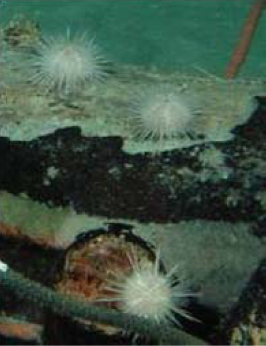
Asterechinus elegans

Deep sea food webs are complex, and aspects of the system are poorly understood. Typically, predator-prey interactions within the deep are compiled by direct observation (likely from remotely operated underwater vehicles), analysis of stomach contents, and biochemical analysis. Stomach content analysis is the most common method used, but it is not reliable for some species.

In deep sea pelagic ecosystems off of California, the trophic web is dominated by deep sea fishes, cephalopods, gelatinous zooplankton, and crustaceans. Between 1991 and 2016, 242 unique feeding relationships between 166 species of predators and prey demonstrated that gelatinous zooplankton have an ecological impact similar to that of large fishes and squid. Narcomedusae, siphonophores (of the family Physonectae), ctenophores, and cephalopods consumed the greatest diversity of prey, in decreasing order. Cannibalism has been documented in squid of the genus Gonatus.

Deep sea mining has severe consequences for ocean ecosystems. The destruction of habitats, disturbance of sediment layers, and noise pollution threaten marine species. Essential biodiversity can be lost, with unpredictable effects on the food chain. Additionally, toxic metals and chemicals can be released, leading to long-term pollution of seawater. This raises questions about the sustainability and environmental costs of such activities.

== Deep sea research ==
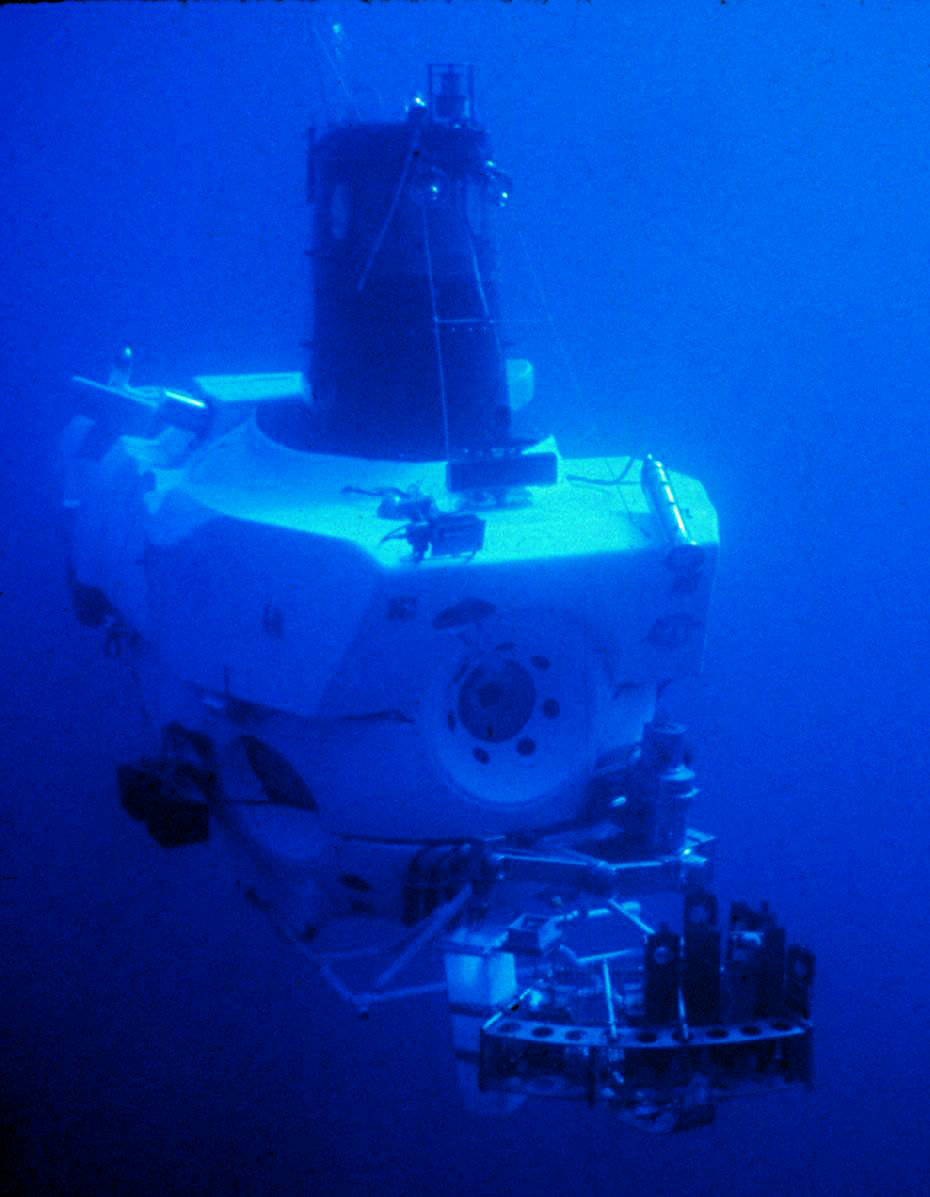
Alvin in 1978, a year after it first explored a hydrothermal vent.

Humans have explored less than 4% of the ocean floor, and dozens of new species of deep sea creatures are discovered with every dive. The submarine DSV Alvin—owned by the US Navy and operated by the Woods Hole Oceanographic Institution (WHOI) in Woods Hole, Massachusetts—exemplifies the type of craft used to explore deep water. This 16 ton submarine can withstand extreme pressure and is easily manoeuvrable despite its weight and size.

The extreme difference in pressure between the sea floor and the surface makes creatures' survival on the surface near impossible; this makes in-depth research difficult because most useful information can only be found while the creatures are alive. Recent developments have allowed scientists to look at these creatures more closely, and for a longer time. Marine biologist Jeffery Drazen has explored a solution: a pressurized fish trap. This captures a deep-water creature, and adjusts its internal pressure slowly to surface level as the creature is brought to the surface, in the hope that the creature can adjust.

Another scientific team, from the Université Pierre-et-Marie-Curie, has developed a capture device known as the PERISCOP, which maintains water pressure as it surfaces, thus keeping the samples in a pressurized environment during the ascent. This permits close study on the surface without any pressure disturbances affecting the sample.

== See also ==
- Deep sea fish
- Movile Cave
- Abandoned Submarines
