= Pourquoi Pas Point =

Location of Pourquoi Pas Point in Antarctica

Pourquoi Pas (66°12′S 136°11′E) is an ice-covered point which forms the west side of the entrance to Victor Bay in East Antarctica. It was charted by the French Antarctic Expedition, 1950–1952, and named in 1954 after the French polar ship Pourquoi-Pas.
