= Centre for Marine Living Resources & Ecology =

Indian research institute

- Emblem of India
- Established: 1998
- Focus: Marine living resources
- Owner: Ministry of Earth Sciences, Govt. of India
- Location: Kochi, Kerala
- Website: www.cmlre.gov.in

The Centre for Marine Living Resources & Ecology (CMLRE) is a research institute in Kochi, Kerala under the Ministry of Earth Sciences, Government of India with a mandate to study marine living resources. Today, apart from implementing various research projects of the ministry, the institute also manages and operates the Fishery Oceanographic Research Vessel (FORV) Sagar Sampada.

== History ==
The institute has its origins in the Sagar Sampada cell, which was established under the then Department of Ocean Development, DOD (upgraded to the Ministry of Earth Sciences in 2006) for managing and co-ordinating activities of FORV Sagar Sampada. During the beginning of the 9th Five Year Plan of the Government of India in 1998, the Marine Living Resources Programme (MLR Programme) was formulated by the DOD with a view of promoting Ocean development activities in the country which inter-alia include mapping of the living resources, preparing inventory of commercially exploitable living marine resources, their optimum utilization through ecosystem management and R & D in basic sciences on Marine Living Resources & Ecology. With the objective of implementing this programme, the Sagar Sampada cell was upgraded to the Centre for Marine Living Resources and Ecology. To this date, the research vessel Sagar Sampada serves as the backbone of the MLR research activities co-ordinated by CMLRE.

During the 9th five-year plan (1998-2002), the Centre co-ordinated the first systematic study of marine life along the Indian shelf waters, along the eastern and western coasts of India. The environmental characteristics of this region and the phytoplankton, zooplankton, marine benthos, fishery resources etc. of this region were systematically characterized for the first time. During the 10th five-year plan (2002-2007) the exploration was extended to the continental slope regions, particularly in the case of marine benthos and fisheries. Research thrust was also placed on studies of harmful algal blooms and marine mammals around the Indian subcontinent. The environmental and productivity patterns around the Indian EEZ continued to be monitored and research on the productivity and fishery resources of the Andaman and Nicobar regions was also carried out. In January 2005, after the devastating 2004 tsunami the institute along with National Institute of Oceanography and School of Marine Sciences, Cochin University of Science and Technology (CUSAT), Kochi carried out one of the first scientific studies regarding the impact of the tsunami on marine life. In the 9th and 10th plan periods, the CMLRE served chiefly as a co-ordinating and fund granting agency, managing the projects that were granted to various other research institutes and universities.

During the 11th five-year plan (2007-2012), the CMLRE established in-house R&D activities, apart from co-ordination of projects in other institutes. In this period, focus was placed on continued monitoring of the pelagic environment and productivity, marine benthos, harmful algal blooms, studies on reproduction and recruitment of sardines in the south-east Arabian Sea, deep-sea fisheries and myctophid resources in the Indian EEZ. Several projects during this period also focused on isolating and identifying bioactive compounds from marine organisms.

== Institute Mandate ==
The Centre has the following mandate

- To develop management strategies for marine living resources through Ecosystem monitoring and modelling efforts.
- Evolving, coordinating and implementing time targeted national /regional R&D programmes in the field of marine living resources and ecology through effective utilization of Fishery and Oceanographic Research Vessel Sagar Sampada.
- Strengthening of research on marine living resources and Ecology including establishment of a data centre for storage and dissemination of data/ information to end users.
- Coordinating the national programmes relating to Southern Ocean Living Resources (Antarctic marine living resources).

== Association with other Institutions ==
Institutes associated with the MLR research programme through fund-granting from CMLRE (past and present) include

- National Institute of Oceanography
- Central Marine Fisheries Research Institute, Kochi
- Central Institute of Fisheries Technology, Kochi
- Cochin University of Science & Technology, Kochi - several departments including the Department of Marine Biology, Microbiology & Biochemistry, the School of Industrial Fisheries and Department of Electronics
- Annamalai University - Centre for Advanced Studies in Marine Biology, Parangipettai
- Andhra University - Department of Marine Living Resources, Visakhapatnam
- Pondicherry University - Department of Ocean Studies and Marine Biology, Port Blair
