= Pourquoi-Pas (1908) =

French polar exploration ship

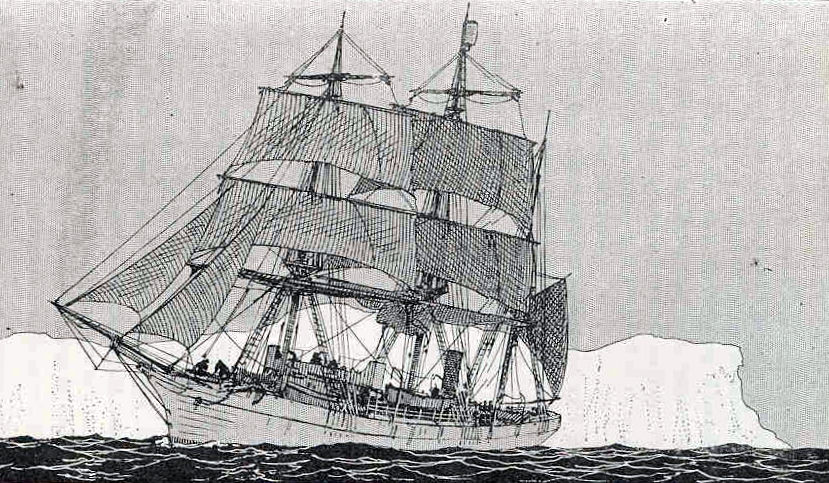
- Pourquoi-Pas, the ship which served Dr Charcot on his last expedition in the Antarctic; now belonging to the Museum d'Histoire Naturelle

History

France
- Name: Pourquoi-Pas
- Builder: François Gautier, Saint Malo
- Laid down: 1907
- Launched: 1908
- Fate: Wrecked on 16 September 1936

General characteristics
- Displacement: 445 tonnes
- Length: 40 m
- Beam: 9.2 m
- Draught: 4.3 m
- Propulsion: Sail; 450 HP engine
- Speed: 7.5 knots
- Capacity: 5 scientists
- Complement: 35 men

Pourquoi-Pas (from the French pourquoi pas?, 'why not?', pronounced [puʁkwa pa]) was the fourth ship built for Jean-Baptiste Charcot, which completed the second Charcot expedition of the Antarctic regions from 1908 to 1910. Charcot died aboard when the ship was wrecked on 16 September 1936 off the coast of Iceland. Of the forty men on board, only one survived.

== History ==
In 1907, Jean-Baptiste Charcot launched a new Antarctic expedition and began work on a new ship, Pourquoi-Pas (IV), a three-masted barque designed for polar exploration, equipped with a motor and containing three laboratories and a library. It was built at Saint-Malo to plans by Francois Gautier in his shipyard.

From 1908 to 1910, Charcot set out in Pourquoi-Pas, wintering at Petermann Island, on his second Antarctic polar expedition. He returned to France in 1910 laden with scientific discoveries; he had finished the mapping of Alexander Island and discovered a new island, Charcot Land.

In 1912, Pourquoi-Pas became the French Navy's first school ship. From 1918 to 1925, Charcot took Pourquoi-Pas on various scientific missions in the North Atlantic, the English Channel, the Mediterranean and the Faroe Islands, mainly to study underwater lithology and geology by means of drag nets, to whose material and use Charcot made major improvements.

From 1925 onwards, limited by age, Charcot lost command of the ship (though he remained on board as head of the expedition) for her many voyages around the Arctic glaciers. In 1926, Charcot and Pourquoi-Pas explored the eastern coast of Greenland and brought back many fossils and samples of insects and flora.

In 1928, Pourquoi-Pas set out to investigate the disappearance of the large French seaplane Latham 47 with the Norwegian explorer Roald Amundsen on board, which had itself been looking for the Italian general Umberto Nobile, who had set out to cross the North Pole in the dirigible Italia and not been heard from since.

In 1934, Charcot and Pourquoi-Pas set up an ethnographic mission in Greenland headed by Paul-Émile Victor, who spent a year in Angmagssalik living amid the Eskimo population. In 1935, Charcot and Pourquoi-Pas returned there to look for Victor and his three companions (Gessain, Pérez et Matter) and began the mapping of these regions. On 16 September that year, the ship managed to reach a small port to escape a cyclone which ravaged the coasts of Iceland.

In September 1936, returning from the mission to Greenland to deliver scientific material to Victor's mission (which had just traversed the ice sheets in 50 days) and after carrying out a survey mission, Pourquoi-Pas stopped at Reykjavík to re-provision with fuel on 13 September. They set out for Saint-Malo two days later, on 15 September, but on 16 September the ship was caught in a violent cyclonic storm and lost on the reefs of Álftanes at Mýrar. 23 of the crew were lost in the wreck and 17 survivors died before rescue came, leaving only one survivor, Eugène Gonidec, master steersman. Jean-Baptiste Charcot was one of the dead, aged 69.

Pourquoi Pas Point and Pourquoi Pas Island in Antarctica were later named after it, as well as a research ship that was launched in 2005 and is currently in service.

== See also ==
- List of Antarctic exploration ships from the Heroic Age, 1897–1922

== Specifications ==
Ship type: barque

Expeditions:

- Antarctic: 1908 to 1910
- Arctic: 1921, 1925, 1927, 1928, 1930, 1931–1933, 1934, 1935, 1936

Oceanographic equipment: trawling and drag nets, screws, sounding equipment, water bottles and thermometers

== Gallery ==
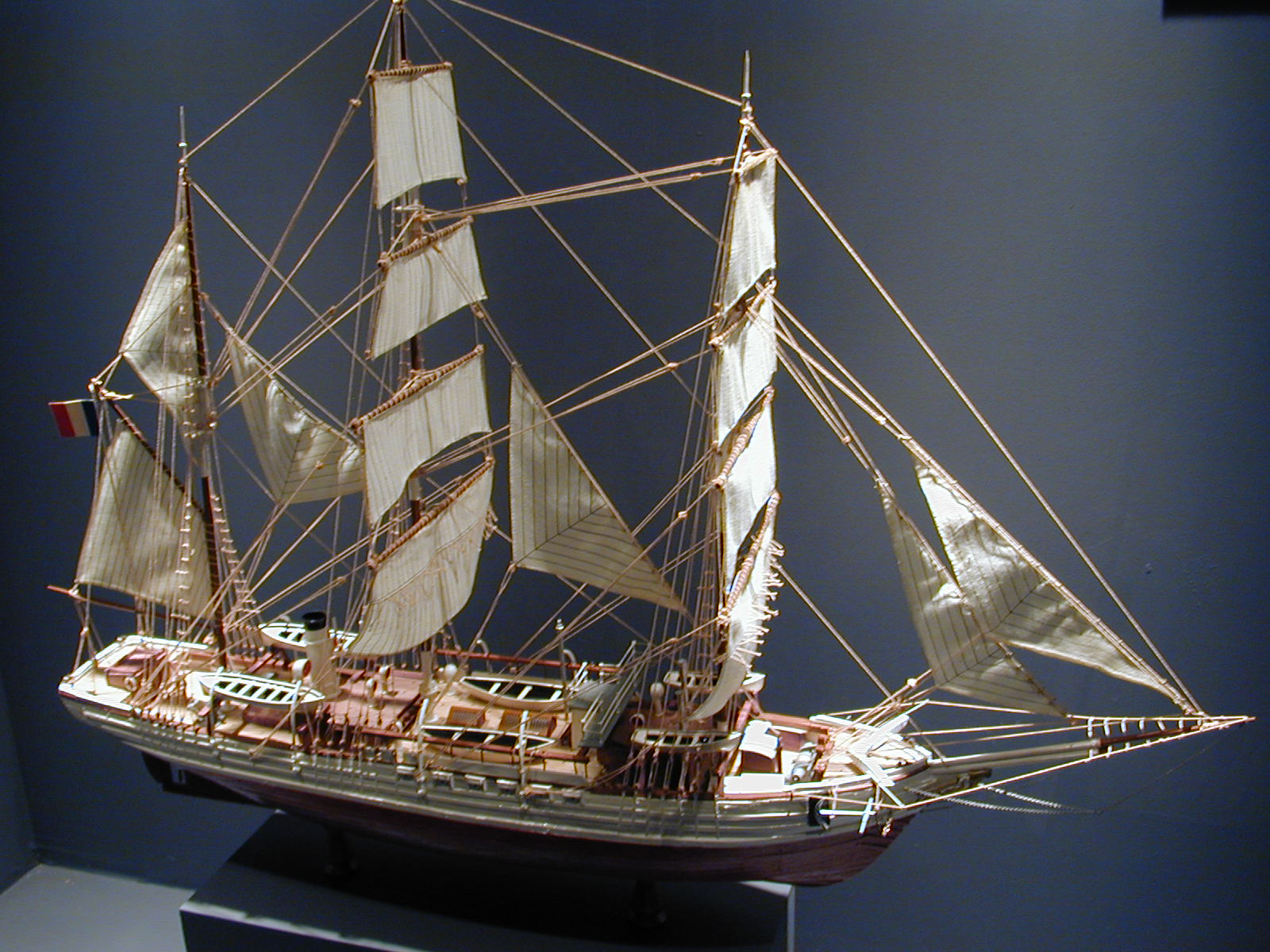
Scale model at the Oceanographic Museum of Monaco, made for the "Voyages en Océanographie" exhibition (24 July 2003 - 30 April 2006).

Route of Pourquoi-Pas in the Antarctic (second French Antarctic expedition, led by Charcot)
