= PERISCOP =

Pressurized recovery device designed for retrieving deep-sea marine life

The PERISCOP is a pressurized recovery device designed for retrieving deep-sea marine life at depths exceeding 2,000 metres. The device was designed by Bruce Shillito and Gerard Hamel at the Universite Pierre et Marie Curie. The name is an acronym for the French phrase Projet d’Enceinte de Remontée Isobare Servant la Capture d’Organismes Profonds ("Enclosure project for isobaric ascent serving to capture deep organisms").

== History ==
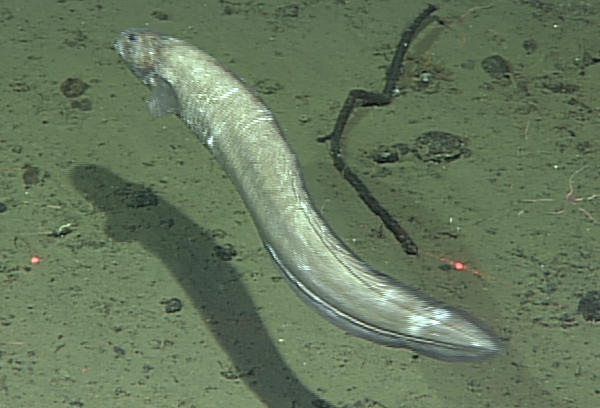
The Pachycara species retrieved by the PERISCOP

The PERISCOP is a unique pressurized recovery device that contains three chambers – one for capture, one for recovery under exterior pressure, and one for transfer to the laboratory while maintaining pressure. Previous recovery devices used one chamber for all purposes. An arm designed to capture samples by force of suction is attached to the device. During ascent, pressure is maintained within the chamber by use of pressurized water. Upon surfacing, samples can be observed, filmed, and/or photographed through transparent view ports in the device. Due to fluctuations in atmospheric pressure and temperature recorded pressures during ascent and at the surface may range from 74%-111% of the natural pressure at sea depth. The device set a record for the deepest live-fish capture under pressure when it captured a Pachycara at 2,300 m. The previous record was 1,400 m. The capture was the first to be performed at a hydrothermal vent. The device has also recovered several shrimp species (Mirocaris fortunata, Chorocaris chacei, and Rimicaris exoculata) at vent fields Lucky Strike and Rainbow.
