= National Institute of Ocean Technology =

Scientific organization in Tamil Nadu

- NIOT

Agency overview
- Formed: November 1993; 32 years ago
- Jurisdiction: Government of India
- Headquarters: Chennai, Tamil Nadu; 12.946656°N 80.211007°E
- Agency executive: Prof. Balaji Ramakrishnan, Director
- Parent agency: Ministry of Earth Sciences
- Website: www.niot.res.in

The National Institute of Ocean Technology (NIOT) was established in November 1993 as an autonomous society under the Ministry of Earth Sciences in India. NIOT is managed by a Governing Council and is headed by a director. The institute is based in Chennai. The major aim of starting NIOT was to develop reliable indigenous technologies to solve various engineering problems associated with harvesting of non-living and living resources in India's exclusive economic zone, which is about two-thirds of the land area of India.

== Technology Groups ==
=== Coastal and Environmental Engineering ===
The group functions with a mandate to develop application-oriented technologies in ocean-related (Coastal & Environmental) areas. The goals of the group are to promote programs consistent with the overall development perspective of the country in the infrastructure sector thereby contributing to the nation building exercise.

The group caters to specific sponsored-research and industrial sector projects by providing technical support and time-bound, result-oriented research. Coastal and Environmental Engineering (CEE) program aims to bring the state of the art technology in coastal infrastructure development through field observation, numerical modeling and engineering application.

=== Energy & Fresh Water ===
The main area of focus of this group is the utilization of the ocean resources to find alternative technologies for producing fresh water (including clean drinking water) and renewable energy. Currently the group is working on three specific areas, fresh water production using low temperature thermal desalination (LTTD) process and energy production using two distinctly different processes, ocean thermal energy conversion and wave energy.

Technologies like Low Temperature Thermal Desalination (LTTD) using coolant water discharge from thermal power plant, wave energy using floating devices such as Backward Bent Ducted Buoy (BBDB), ocean current turbine development, solar desalination, heat exchangers for LTTD and ocean thermal energy conversion are the focal areas of research. Apart from the aspect of technology development, the group has taken initiative in transferring the LTTD technology to the society through industrial partnership. LTTD is set up in many places. We can see LTTD in Kavaratti, Aggati, Minicoy islands, and NCTPS (Chennai).

=== Marine Sensor System ===
Marine Sensor Systems group was established in September 2005 to cater to the mandate of NIOT to develop and demonstrate technologies for oceans. Since then group has been concentrating on the development of different types of underwater sensor systems apart from electronic support given to the other groups in NIOT. Most of the underwater systems are acoustic based systems with underwater electronics. The group's activities have attracted several industries.

Needs of NIOT are unique and all the requirements could not be met with the facilities available at NIOT earlier. Now, facilities to qualify electronics under different conditions of underwater operation have been established like, EMI/EMC analyzer, Helium Leak detector, Environment testing systems, Corrosion Chamber and Shock & Vibration testing chamber, under a single umbrella.

=== Marine Biotechnology ===
In order to develop agriculture and tourism, and to study the natural marine resources of the island groups, the Island Development Authority (IDA) was established under the chairmanship of Rajiv Gandhi, the then prime minister of India in the year of 1986. The IDA enlisted the then Department of Ocean Development (DOD), presently Ministry of Earth Sciences, as one of the implementing agencies for carrying out activities that will recuperate the socio-economic status of the island community. Based on the suggestions made by the IDA, the DOD took up several ocean related activities relevant to the Andaman and Nicobar Islands, Lakshadweep and the Gulf of Mannar group of Islands in order to bring in socio-economic benefits to the island communities.

=== Ocean Electronics ===
The Ocean Electronics group was created in December 2009 and has a mandate to develop ocean observation systems and demonstrate for applications in the ocean. The group is involved in the development of Deep Ocean Bottom Pressure Recorder (DOPR) & surface buoy data logger for Tsunami Early Warning Systems, Autonomous Underwater Profiling Drifter (AUPD), and technologies for data communication using INSAT satellites.

=== Offshore Structures ===
NIOT has been developing several offshore components for various programs like desalination, mining, data buoys etc. These include pipelines/risers, moorings in deep water for small buoys as well as large vessels. The need for developing several offshore components has been felt for most of the projects handled in NIOT. The group addresses such needs.

== Technology Projects ==
=== Deep Sea Mining ===
Polymetallic nodules have economically valuable metals such as Copper, Cobalt, Nickel and Manganese in them and are viewed as potential resources to take care of the depleting land resources and increasing demand of these metals. There are more than 380 million tons of nodules in the retained Indian Pioneer area. However development of deep subsea technology for mining these resources is a major challenge considering the depth of occurrence of these nodules being 4000–6000 m, ultra high pressure environment and very low temperatures, very soft soils for supporting heavy mining equipment and difficulties in vertical transport of the harvested nodules. NIOT has been working on a mining concept where a crawler based mining machine collects, crushes and pumps nodules to the mother ship using a high pressure slurry pump through a flexible riser system. With this perspective, the integrated mining system is under development for demonstration of deep-sea mining of polymetallic nodules.

=== Gas Hydrates ===
This group was created to cater to the sustained development of technology towards harnessing the enormous potential offered by the ocean towards the energy sectors and also to the industries related to offshore activities with particular reference to gas hydrates. Gas hydrates are crystalline combination of a natural gas and water (known technically as a clathrate) looks remarkably like ice but burns if it meets a match lit. Energy in the gas hydrates amount to twice as much as all fossil fuels combined. Gas hydrate estimated to contribute a very large amount of methane, a potential clear hydrocarbon fuel resource.

=== Submersibles ===
Development of deep-water work class ROV by NIOT in collaboration with Experimental Design Bureau of Oceanological Engineering (EDBOE), Moscow was initiated by Polymetallic Nodule Management (PMN) Board of the Ministry of Earth Sciences (MoES), Govt. of India. The submersible is equipped with multifunctional tools and sensors for offshore applications such as deep ocean mineral exploration, seabed imaging, gas hydrate exploration, pipeline routing, submarine cabling, well head detection, sampling etc.

== Operational Programs ==
=== Ocean Observation Systems ===
Under the Ocean Observation Network (OON) programme of ESSO MoES, the Ocean observation systems (OOS) group of NIOT is entrusted to undertake the activities on moored buoy programme. The OOS group, erstwhile National Data Buoy Programme, was established in 1996, with the objective to operate, maintain and develop moored buoy observational networks and related telecommunication facilities in the Indian seas. Later, OOS inherited lead responsibility for a number of important and well-established observational programmes in the northern Indian Ocean. Due to the remoteness of the vast open oceans, there have been challenges to continuous observation of the ocean, which was later harmonized by in-situ and satellite based observations.

=== Vessel Management ===
The Vessel Management Cell, or 'VMC', is an operational wing of NIOT which manages the running, operation and maintenance of the fleet of MoES research vessels viz. ORV Sagar Nidhi, BTV Sagar Manjusha, CRV Sagar Purvi and CRV Sagar Paschimi. It was established in 1996, with an aim to manage two coastal research vessels, CRV Sagar Purvi and CRV Sagar Paschimi, that had been acquired by the Ministry of Earth Sciences (MoES) for assessing coastal pollution, coastal pollution monitoring, coastal surveys and near shore multidisciplinary work. In 2001, VMC committed to manage a barge, Sagar Shakthi, that was used to implement a 1MW gross pilot plant to demonstrate OTEC technology, which was the first ever such attempt in the world.
