= Ministry of Earth Sciences =

Government ministry of India

- Branch of the Union of India

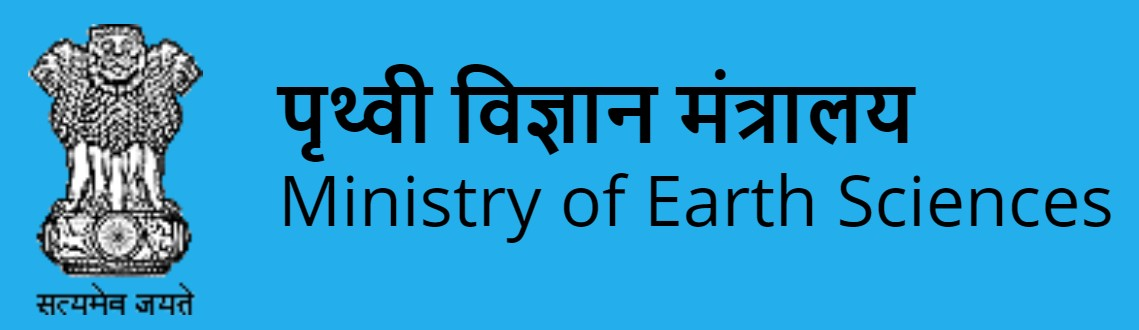
- Ministry of Earth Sciences

Agency overview
- Formed: 29-January-2006; 20 years ago
- Jurisdiction: Union of India
- Headquarters: Prithvi Bhavan Lodi Road New Delhi; 28°35′28″N 77°13′32″E
- Annual budget: ₹3,789.23 crore (US$400 million) (2026-27)
- Minister responsible: Dr. Jitendra Singh Union Minister of State (Independent Charge) for Earth Sciences
- Agency executive: Dr. Srinivasa Kumar Tummala
- Website: www.moes.gov.in

The Ministry of Earth Sciences is an executive ministry of the Union of India, established on 29-January-2006. It was formed through the reorganisation of the Department of Ocean Development and the assumption of administrative control over various institutions, including the India Meteorological Department, the National Centre for Medium Range Weather Forecasting, the Indian Institute of Tropical Meteorology, and the Earth Risk Evaluation Centre.

== History ==
In 1981, the Union of India established the Department of Ocean Development (DOD) under the Cabinet Secretariat, directly reporting to the Prime Minister of India. In 1982, it became a separate department and began focusing on ocean development activities. In 2006, the department was elevated to a Ministry, known as the Ministry of Ocean Development. Later that same year, the ministry underwent reorganisation, and the Ministry of Earth Sciences was created, incorporating various institutions under its jurisdiction. Through a government resolution in 2006, the India Meteorological Department, the Indian Institute of Tropical Meteorology, and the National Centre for Medium Range Weather Forecasting and Research were brought under its administrative control. The resolution also led to the establishment of an Earth Commission, modelled after the Atomic Energy Commission and the Space Commission.

The ministry is currently headed by Dr. Jitendra Singh.

== Functions ==
The Ministry's mandate is to look after Atmospheric Sciences, Ocean Science & Technology and Seismology in an integrated fashion.

== Organisation ==
- Earth Systems Sciences Council (ESSC)
  - Indian Institute of Tropical Meteorology
  - National Centre for Polar and Ocean Research
  - National Institute of Ocean Technology
  - National Center for Earth Science Studies
  - Indian National Centre for Ocean Information Services
- National Centre for Coastal Research
- India Meteorological Department
  - Bharat Forecast System
- National Centre for Seismology
- National Centre for Medium Range Weather Forecasting
- Earthquake Risk Evaluation Centre (under the Atmospheric Sciences and Seismology sector)
- Indian Tsunami Early Warning Centre
- Centre for Marine Living Resources & Ecology (under the Ocean Science & Technology sector)

== Cabinet Ministers ==
- Note: MoS, I/C – Minister of State (Independent Charge)

No.	Portrait	Minister (Birth-Death) Constituency	Term of office			Political party	Ministry	Prime Minister
No.	Portrait	Minister (Birth-Death) Constituency	From	To	Period	Political party	Ministry	Prime Minister
Minister in the Department of Ocean Development
1		Rajiv Gandhi (1944–1991); MP for Amethi (Prime Minister)	31 December 1984	2 December 1989	4 years, 336 days	Indian National Congress (I)	Rajiv II	Self
2		Vishwanath Pratap Singh (1931–2008); MP for Fatehpur (Prime Minister)	2 December 1989	10 November 1990	343 days	Janata Dal	Vishwanath	Self
3		Chandra Shekhar (1927–2007); MP for Ballia (Prime Minister)	10 November 1990	21 June 1991	223 days	Samajwadi Janata Party (Rashtriya)	Chandra Shekhar	Self
4		P. V. Narasimha Rao (1921–2004); MP for Nandyal (Prime Minister)	21 June 1991	16 May 1996	4 years, 330 days	Indian National Congress (I)	Rao	Self
5		Atal Bihari Vajpayee (1924–2018); MP for Lucknow (Prime Minister)	16 May 1996	1 June 1996	16 days	Bharatiya Janata Party	Vajpayee I	Self
6		H. D. Deve Gowda (born 1933); Rajya Sabha MP for Karnataka (Prime Minister)	1 June 1996	21 April 1997	324 days	Janata Dal	Deve Gowda	Self
7		Inder Kumar Gujral (1919–2012); Rajya Sabha MP for Bihar (Prime Minister)	21 April 1997	18 March 1998	331 days	Janata Dal	Gujral	Self
(5)		Atal Bihari Vajpayee (1924–2018); MP for Lucknow (Prime Minister)	19 March 1998	3 February 1999	321 days	Bharatiya Janata Party	Vajpayee II	Atal Bihari Vajpayee
8		Murli Manohar Joshi (born 1934); MP for Allahabad	3 February 1999	13 October 1999	252 days	Bharatiya Janata Party	Vajpayee II	Atal Bihari Vajpayee
(5)		Atal Bihari Vajpayee (1924–2018); MP for Lucknow (Prime Minister)	13 October 1999	22 November 1999	40 days	Bharatiya Janata Party	Vajpayee III	Atal Bihari Vajpayee
(8)		Murli Manohar Joshi (born 1934); MP for Allahabad	22 November 1999	22 May 2004	4 years, 182 days	Bharatiya Janata Party	Vajpayee III	Atal Bihari Vajpayee
9		Kapil Sibal (born 1948); MP for Chandni Chowk (MoS, I/C)	23 May 2004	29 January 2006	1 year, 251 days	Indian National Congress	Manmohan I	Manmohan Singh
Minister of Ocean Development
(9)		Kapil Sibal (born 1948); MP for Chandni Chowk	29 January 2006	12 July 2006	164 days	Indian National Congress	Manmohan I	Manmohan Singh
Minister of Earth Sciences
(9)		Kapil Sibal (born 1948); MP for Chandni Chowk	12 July 2006	22 May 2009	2 years, 314 days	Indian National Congress	Manmohan I	Manmohan Singh
10		Prithviraj Chavan (born 1946); Rajya Sabha MP for Maharashtra (MoS, I/C)	28 May 2009	10 November 2010	1 year, 166 days	Indian National Congress	Manmohan II	Manmohan Singh
(9)		Kapil Sibal (born 1948); MP for Chandni Chowk	10 November 2010	19 January 2011	70 days	Indian National Congress	Manmohan II	Manmohan Singh
11		Pawan Kumar Bansal (born 1948); MP for Chandigarh	19 January 2011	12 July 2011	174 days	Indian National Congress	Manmohan II	Manmohan Singh
12		Vilasrao Deshmukh (1945–2012); Rajya Sabha MP for Maharashtra	12 July 2011	10 August 2012	1 year, 29 days	Indian National Congress	Manmohan II	Manmohan Singh
13		Vayalar Ravi (born 1937); Rajya Sabha MP for Kerala	10 August 2012	28 October 2012	79 days	Indian National Congress	Manmohan II	Manmohan Singh
14		S. Jaipal Reddy (1942–2019); MP for Chevella	28 October 2012	26 May 2014	1 year, 210 days	Indian National Congress	Manmohan II	Manmohan Singh
15		Jitendra Singh (born 1956); MP for Udhampur (MoS, I/C)	27 May 2014	9 November 2014	166 days	Bharatiya Janata Party	Modi I	Narendra Modi
16		Harsh Vardhan (born 1954); MP for Chandni Chowk	9 November 2014	30 May 2019	6 years, 240 days	Bharatiya Janata Party	Modi I	Narendra Modi
16		Harsh Vardhan (born 1954); MP for Chandni Chowk	31 May 2019	7 July 2021	6 years, 240 days	Bharatiya Janata Party	Modi II	Narendra Modi
(15)		Jitendra Singh (born 1956); MP for Udhampur (MoS, I/C)	7 July 2021	18 May 2023	1 year, 315 days	Bharatiya Janata Party	Modi II	Narendra Modi
17		Kiren Rijiju (born 1971); MP for Arunachal West	18 May 2023	9 June 2024	1 year, 22 days	Bharatiya Janata Party	Modi II	Narendra Modi
(15)		Jitendra Singh (born 1956); MP for Udhampur (MoS, I/C)	10 June 2024	Incumbent	2 years, 165 days	Bharatiya Janata Party	Modi III	Narendra Modi

== Ministers of State ==
No.	Portrait	Minister (Birth-Death) Constituency	Term of office			Political party	Ministry	Prime Minister
No.	Portrait	Minister (Birth-Death) Constituency	From	To	Period	Political party	Ministry	Prime Minister
1		C. P. N. Singh; MP for Padrauna	15 February 1982	2 February 1983	352 days	Indian National Congress (I)	Indira IV	Indira Gandhi
2		Shivraj Patil (born 1935); MP for Latur	29 January 1983	31 October 1984	3 years, 262 days	Indian National Congress (I)	Indira IV	Indira Gandhi
2		Shivraj Patil (born 1935); MP for Latur	4 November 1984	31 December 1984	3 years, 262 days	Indian National Congress (I)	Rajiv I	Rajiv Gandhi
2		Shivraj Patil (born 1935); MP for Latur	31 December 1984	22 October 1986	3 years, 262 days	Indian National Congress (I)	Rajiv II	Rajiv Gandhi
3		K. R. Narayanan (1921–2005); MP for Ottapalam	22 October 1986	2 December 1989	3 years, 41 days	Indian National Congress (I)	Rajiv II	Rajiv Gandhi
4		M. G. K. Menon (1928–2016); Rajya Sabha MP for Rajasthan	25 December 1989	10 November 1990	320 days	Janata Dal	Vishwanath	Vishwanath Pratap Singh
5		Rangarajan Kumaramangalam (1952–2000); MP for Salem	2 July 1992	2 December 1993	1 year, 153 days	Indian National Congress (I)	Rao	P. V. Narasimha Rao
6		Eduardo Faleiro (born 1940); MP for Mormugao	18 December 1993	16 May 1996	2 years, 150 days	Indian National Congress (I)	Rao	P. V. Narasimha Rao
Minister of State for Earth Sciences
7		Ashwani Kumar (born 1952); Rajya Sabha MP for Punjab	19 January 2011	28 October 2012	1 year, 283 days	Indian National Congress	Manmohan II	Manmohan Singh
8		Y. S. Chowdary (born 1961); Rajya Sabha MP for Andhra Pradesh	9 November 2014	9 March 2018	3 years, 120 days	Telugu Desam Party	Modi I	Narendra Modi

== Networking ==
All institutions under ESSO are connected through National Knowledge Network and its Common User Group (CUG).

== See also ==
- Ministry of Science and Technology (India)
