= Anupam (supercomputer) =

Anupam is a series of supercomputers designed and developed by Bhabha Atomic Research Centre (BARC) for their internal usages. It is mainly used for molecular dynamical simulations, reactor physics, theoretical physics, computational chemistry, computational fluid dynamics, and finite element analysis.

The latest in the series is Anupam-Aganya.

== Introduction ==
Bhabha Atomic Research Centre (BARC) carries out inter-disciplinary and multi-disciplinary R&D activities covering a wide range of disciplines in physical sciences, chemical sciences, biological sciences and engineering. Expertise at BARC covers the entire spectrum of science and technology.

BARC has started development of supercomputers under the ANUPAM project in 1991 and till date, has developed more than 20 different computer systems. All ANUPAM systems have employed parallel processing as the underlying philosophy and MIMD (Multiple Instruction Multiple Data) as the core architecture. BARC, being a multidisciplinary research organization, has a large pool of scientists and engineers, working in various aspects of nuclear science and technology and thus are involved in doing diverse nature of computations.

To keep the gestation period short, the parallel computers were built with commercially available off-the-shelf components, with BARC's major contribution being in the areas of system integration, system engineering, system software development, application software development, fine tuning of the system and support to a diverse set of users.

The series started with a small four-processor system in 1991 with a sustained performance of 34 MFlops. Keeping in mind the ever increasing demands from the users, new systems have been built regularly with increasing computational power. The latest in the series of supercomputers is the 4608 core ANUPAM-Adhya system developed in 2010-11, with a sustained performance of 47 TeraFLOPS on the standard High Performance Linpack (HPL) benchmark. The system is in production mode and released to users.

In 2001, BARC achieved a new milestone in developing a supercomputer 20-25 times faster than the fastest computer built by other institutes in the country when it commissioned ANUPAM-PENTIUM.

== Anupam Systems ==
Sr. No.	Name	Processing Power	Year	No. of Processors	Installation
1	ANUPAM-AGANYA	270 TFLOPS	2016-	6440 cores + 20 9984 core GPU	Trombay
2	ANUPAM-AGGRA	150 TFLOPS	2012-	8160 cores + 80 512 core GPU	Trombay
3	ANUPAM-ADHYA	47 TFLOPS	2010-	4608 cores @ 3.0 GHz	Trombay
4	ANUPAM-AJEYA	9.036 TFLOPS		1152 cores	Trombay
5	ANUPAM-AMEYA	1.73 TFLOPS		512 cores	Trombay
6	ANUPAM-ARUNA	365 GFLOPS		128 cores	
7	ANUPAM-XENON	202 GFLOPS	2003-04	128 cores @ 2.4 GHz	
8	ANUPAM-PIV	43 GFLOPS	2002-03	64 cores @ 1.7 GHz	
9	ANUPAM-PENTIUM	15 GFLOPS	2001–02	84 cores @ 600 MHz	
10	ANUPAM-PENTIUM			16 cores	
11	ANUPAM-ALPHA	1 GFLOPS	1997-98		Replaced CRAY XMP216 at NCMRWF, Mausam Bhavan, New Delhi
12	ANUPAM-ASHVA			64	
13	ANUPAM 860/4	30 MFLOPS	1991	4 cores	

== See also ==
- PARAM
- SAGA-220, a 220 TeraFLOP supercomputer built by ISRO
- EKA
- Wipro Supernova
- Supercomputing in India
