= Vijay P. Bhatkar =

Indian computer scientist

Vijay Bhatkar
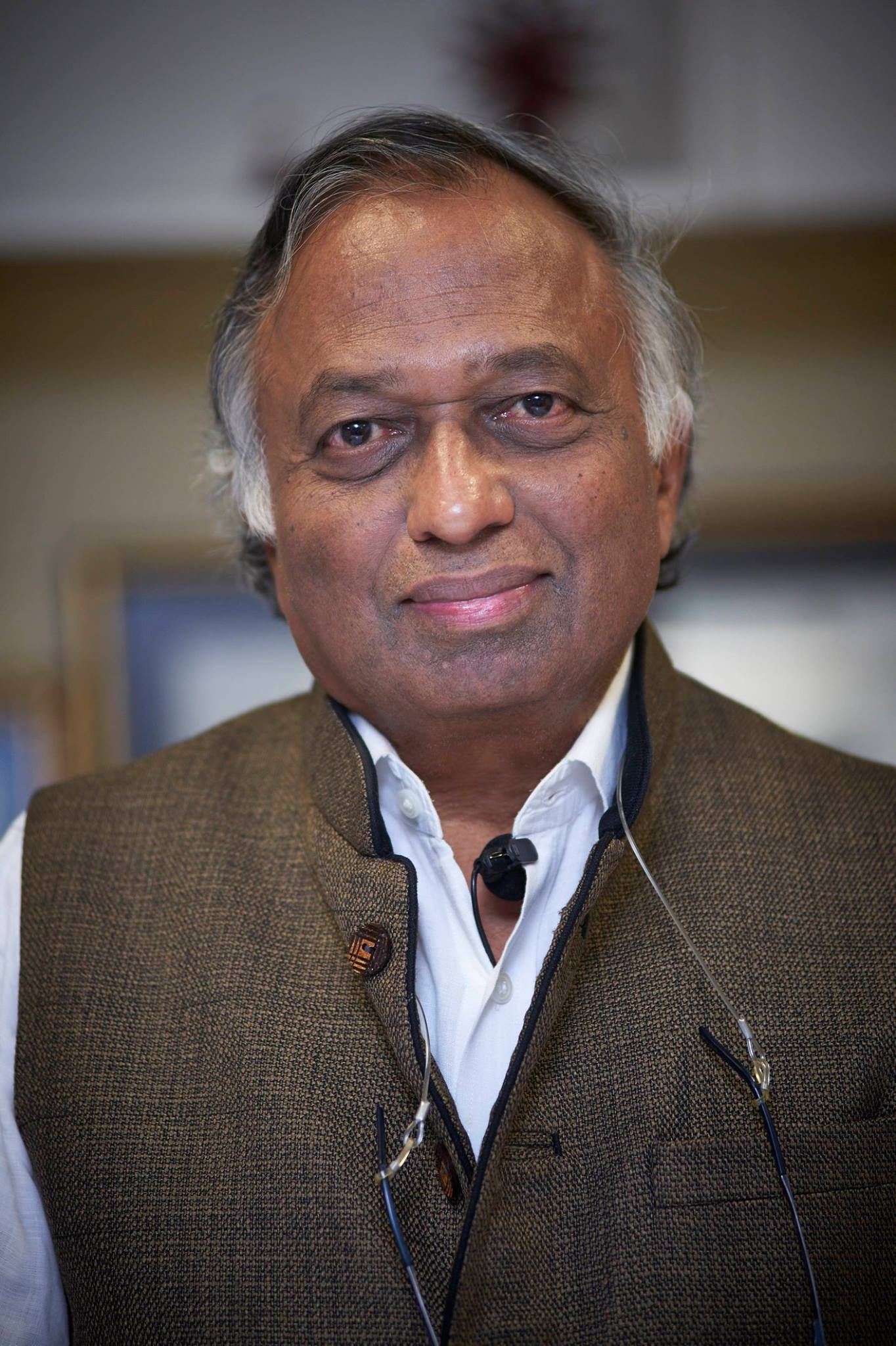

Chancellor of Nalanda University
- In office 25 January 2017 – 29 April 2023
- Succeeded by: Arvind Panagariya

Personal details
- Born: Vijay Pandurang Bhatkar; 11 October 1946 (age 79) Muramba, Akola district, Maharashtra, India
- Education: Visvesvaraya National Institute of Technology (B.E.); Maharaja Sayajirao University of Baroda (M.E.); Indian Institute of Technology, Delhi (Ph.D.)
- Known for: Architect of PARAM Supercomputers
- Awards: Asian Scientist 100 (2016); Padma Bhushan (2015); Padma Shri (2000); Maharashtra Bhushan (1999)
- Website: www.vijaybhatkar.org

Vijay Pandurang Bhatkar is an Indian computer scientist, IT leader and educationalist. He is best known as the architect of India's National Initiative in Supercomputing where he led the development of Param supercomputers. He is a Padma Shri, Padma Bhushan, and Maharashtra Bhushan recipient. Indian computer magazine Dataquest placed him among the pioneers of India's IT industry. He was the founder and executive director of Centre for Development of Advanced Computing (C-DAC) and is currently working on developing exascale supercomputing for India.

Bhatkar has been chancellor of Nalanda University, in Bihar, India since January 2017. From 2012 to 2017, he served as the Chairman of the Board of Governors of IIT Delhi. Currently, he is serving as the Chairman of Vijnana Bharati, a non-profit organization of Indian scientists.

== Career ==
Bhatkar was born in Muramba, Taluka Murtijapur, District Akola in a maharashtrian family Maharashtra, India. He received a B.E. degree in Electrical Engineering from Nagpur University, Nagpur; ME degree from the MS University of Baroda, Vadodara and a PhD from IIT Delhi.

Bhatkar is best known as the architect of India's national initiative in supercomputing where he led the development of Param supercomputers. He developed the first Indian supercomputer, the PARAM 8000, in 1991 and later the PARAM 10000 in 1998. Based on the PARAM series of supercomputers, he built the National Param Supercomputing Facility (NPSF) which is now made available as a grid computing facility through the Garuda grid on the National Knowledge Network (NKN) providing nationwide access to High Performance Computing (HPC) infrastructure. Currently, Bhatkar is working on exascale supercomputing via the capability, capacity and infrastructure on NKN.

Bhatkar has played a significant role in forming several national institutions and research centers including Centre for Development of Advanced Computing (C-DAC), the Electronics Research and Development Centre (ER&DC) in Thiruvananthapuram, Indian Institute of Information Technology and Management, Kerala (IIITM-K), the ETH Research Laboratory and International Institute of Information Technology (I2IT) in Pune, Maharashtra Knowledge Corporation (MKCL) and the India International Multiversity. He has served as a member of the Scientific Advisory Committee to the government of India, CSIR governing body, IT Task Force, and eGovernance committee chairman of the governments of Maharashtra and Goa. He also serves as the president of Vijnana Bharati.

In 2016, Bhatkar was appointed as the Chairperson of the Science & Engineering Research Body (SERB). In January 2017, Bhatkar was appointed as the Chancellor of the Nalanda University. He is also the Founder Chancellor and Chief Mentor of Multiversity. Dr. Vijay Bhatkar has served as the Chairman of the Board of Governors of IIT-Delhi (2012-2017), Chairman of the ETH (Education To Home) Research Lab, Chairman of the Board of Management of Government College of Engineering, Amravati, Chancellor of D. Y. Patil University, and National President of Vijnana Bharati, a People's Science Movement of over 6,000 scientists across India.

Bhatkar has authored and edited over 12 books and 80 technical and research papers and addressed several university convocations, international and national conferences and conventions and public functions.

== Honorary doctorates ==
In 2011, Bhatkar received an honorary doctorate from DY Patil University. In 2014, he was awarded an honorary Ph.D from Gujarat Technological University and a D.Litt. degree from Nagpur University. On 10 December 2024, Bhatkar received an honorary doctorate degree D.Litt. from Veer Madho Singh Bhandari Uttarakhand Technical University.
