= Pratyush and Mihir =

Supercomputer in India

Pratyush
- Active: 8 January 2018
- Operators: Indian Institute of Tropical Meteorology
- Location: Indian Institute of Tropical Meteorology, Pune; National Centre for Medium Range Weather Forecasting, Noida
- Speed: 6.8 PetaFlops
- Cost: INR 4,389,000,000
- Purpose: Weather forecasting, Climate research

Pratyush and Mihir are the supercomputers established at Indian Institute of Tropical Meteorology (IITM), Pune and National Centre for Medium Range Weather Forecast (NCMRWF), Noida respectively. As of January 2018, Pratyush and Mihir are the fastest supercomputer in India with a maximum speed of 6.8 PetaFlops at a total cost of INR 438.9 Crore. The system was inaugurated by Dr. Harsh Vardhan, Union Minister for science and technology, on 8 January 2018.The word 'Pratyush' (Hindi: प्रत्युष) defines the rising sun.

Being a High Performance Computing (HPC) facility, Pratyush and Mihir consists of several computers that can deliver a peak power of 6.8 PetaFlops. (Note: PetaFlops is a measure of computing capacity of a system. One PetaFlops is 1000 trillion floating point operations per second.) It is the first multi-PetaFlops supercomputer ever built in India.

Pratyush and Mihir are two High Performance Computing (HPC) units. They are located at two government institutes, one being 4.0 PetaFlops unit at IITM, Pune and another 2.8 PetaFlops unit at the National Centre for Medium Range Weather Forecasting (NCMRWF), Noida. They provide a combined output of 6.8 PetaFlops.

Pratyush and Mihir are used in the fields of weather forecasting and climate monitoring in India. It helps the country to make better forecasts in terms of Monsoon, fishing, air quality, extreme events like Tsunami, cyclones, earthquakes, lightning and other natural calamities such as floods, droughts etc. India is the fourth country in the world to have a High Performance Computing facility dedicated for weather and climate research after Japan, the United States and the United Kingdom.

== History ==
The High Performance Computing (HPC) facility in India has grown from 40 TeraFlops in 2008 to 1 PetaFlops in the year 2013–14. But India still remained at a lower position in terms of HPC infrastructure rankings in the world.

Government of India approved 400 crore Rupees in 2017 to build a supercomputer with a computing capacity of 10 PetaFlops. The engineers of IITM, Pune worked under the leadership of Suryachandra A Rao and built Pratyush in 2018. The overall cost was around 450 crore Indian Rupees.

With the introduction of Pratyush and Mihir, India hopes to move from the 165th position to gain a position in the top 30s in the Top500 list of supercomputers in the world.

== See also ==
- EKA
- SAGA-220
- Cray XC40
