= ERNET =

National research and education network of India

Education and Research Network
- Logo of ERNET

Government agency overview
- Formed: 1986; 40 years ago
- Jurisdiction: Government of India
- Headquarters: 5th Floor, Block-I, A Wing, Delhi IT Park, Shastri Park, Delhi - 110053, India
- Ministers responsible: Ashwini Vaishnaw, Minister of Electronics and Information Technology; Rajeev Chandrasekhar, Minister of State
- Government agency executives: S Krishnan, Chairman (Secretary MeitY); Neena Pahuja, Director General
- Parent department: Ministry of Electronics and Information Technology
- Key document: Citizen Charter
- Website: ernet.in

Education and Research Network (ERNET) is an autonomous scientific society of the Ministry of Electronics and Information Technology, Government of India. ERNET has made a significant contribution to the emergence of networking in the country. It practically brought the Internet to India and has built up national capabilities in the area of net-working, especially in protocol software engineering. It is the first internet service in India. It has not only succeeded in building a large network that provides various facilities to the intellectual segment of Indian society—the research and education community, it has over the years become a trendsetter in the field of networking.

== Focus ==
ERNET is largest nationwide terrestrial and satellite network with point of presence located at the premiere educational and research institutions in major cities of the country. Focus of ERNET is not limited to just providing connectivity, but to meet the entire needs of the educational and research institutions by hosting and providing relevant information to their users. Research and Development and Training are integral parts of ERNET activities. The activities at ERNET India are organised around five technology focus areas:

- National Academic and Research Network
- Research and Development in the area of Data Communication and its Application
- Human Resource Development in the area of High-end Networking
- Educational Content
- Campus-wide High Speed Local Area Network

== Beginning ==
ERNET was initiated in 1986 by the Department of Electronics (DoE), with funding support from the Government of India and United Nations Development Program (UNDP), involving eight premier institutions as participating agencies— NCST (National Centre for Software Technology) [Now CDAC] Bombay, IISc (Indian Institute of Science) Bangalore, five IITs (Indian Institutes of Technology) at Delhi, Bombay, Kanpur, Kharagpur and Madras, and the DoE, New Delhi. ERNET began as a multi protocol network with both the TCP/IP and the OSI-IP protocol stacks running over the leased-line portion of the backbone. Since 1995, however, almost all traffic is carried over TCP/IP.

== History of ERNET ==
- ERNET started with Dial-up network in 1986–87.
- Initially UUCP mail was only service started by ERNET.
- First leased line of 9.6 kbit/s was installed in Jan’1991 between Delhi and Mumbai.
- ERNET was allotted Class B IP address 144.16.0.0 by InterNIC in 1990. Subsequently, Class C addresses were allotted to ERNET by APNIC.
- All IITs, IISc Bangalore, DOE Delhi and NCST Mumbai were connected by 9.6 kbit/s leased line by 1992.
- In 1992, 64 kbit/s Internet gateway link was commissioned from NCST Mumbai to UUNet in Virginia near Washington DC.
- In 1998 ERNET India was registered as Autonomous Society.
- In 1999-2000 new terrestrial high speed backbone was set up.
- In 2000 POP infrastructure was upgraded.
- Satellite WAN was set up in 1993.
- Today, 1100 institutes are ERNET users under different schemes.

== ERNET backbone ==
ERNET backbone is a sophisticated link of terrestrial and satellite-based wide area networks. The satellite WAN, using VSAT technology. The VSAT network acts as an overlay for the terrestrial WAN by providing backup links between the backbone sites. International connectivity is achieved through gateways at New Delhi, Mumbai, Bangalore and Kolkata, with a total capacity of 6.64 Mb. Daily traffic over ERNET exceeds 200 GB. ERNET architecture is based on industry standard TCP/IP protocol. This network had undergone a major upgrade during year 2000–2001 in association with CMC Ltd. (A Govt. of India Undertaking, then).

ERNET backbone is being enabled to support IPv6.

== ERNET international gateway and PoP sites ==
The ERNET is supported by the following backbone sites which enable organizations located at different geographical locations to access various services.

- ERNET Headquarters, New Delhi
- Centre for Development of Advanced Computing, Mumbai
- Indian Institute of Science, Bangalore
- Indian Institute of Technology, Madras
- Indian Institute of Technology, Kharagpur
- Inter-University Centre for Astronomy and Astrophysics, Pune
- Variable Energy Cyclotron Centre, Kolkata
- Indian Institute of Technology, Kanpur
- Indian Institute of Technology, Roorkee
- University of Hyderabad
- Center for Advanced Technology, Indore
- Odisha Computer Application Centre, Bhubaneswar
- Indian Institute of Information Technology and Management, Thiruvananthapuram
- National Institute of Electronics & Information Technology, Gorakhpur
- Indian Institute of Technology, Guwahati
- ERNET VSAT HUB, Bangalore
- Tezpur University, Tezpur
- APJ Abdul Kalam Technological University, Thiruvananthapuram

== See also ==
- National Knowledge Network
