= Supercomputing in India =

Supercomputing in India has a history going back to the 1980s. The Government of India created an indigenous development programme as they had difficulty purchasing foreign supercomputers. As of November 2025, the AIRAWAT supercomputer is the fastest supercomputer in India, having been ranked 188th fastest in the world in the TOP500 supercomputer list. AIRAWAT has been installed at the Centre for Development of Advanced Computing (C-DAC) in Pune.

== History ==
=== Early years ===
India had faced difficulties in the 1980s when trying to purchase supercomputers for academic and weather forecasting purposes. In 1986 the National Aerospace Laboratories (NAL) started the Flosolver project to develop a computer for computational fluid dynamics and aerospace engineering. The Flosolver MK1, described as a parallel processing system, started operations in December 1986.

=== Indigenous development programme ===
In 1987, the Indian government had requested to purchase a Cray X-MP supercomputer; this request was denied by the United States government as the machine could have a dual use in weapons development. After this problem, in the same year, the Government of India decided to promote an indigenous supercomputer development programme. Multiple projects were commissioned from different groups including the Centre for Development of Advanced Computing (C-DAC), the Centre for Development of Telematics (C-DOT), the National Aerospace Laboratories (NAL), the Bhabha Atomic Research Centre (BARC), and the Advanced Numerical Research and Analysis Group (ANURAG). C-DOT created "CHIPPS": the C-DOT High-Performance Parallel Processing System. NAL had started to develop the Flosolver in 1986. BARC created the Anupam series of supercomputers. ANURAG created the PACE series of supercomputers.

=== C-DAC First Mission ===
The C-DAC was created at some point between November 1987 and August 1988. C-DAC was given an initial 3 year budget of Rs 375 million to create a 1000MFLOPS (1GFLOPS) supercomputer by 1991. C-DAC unveiled the PARAM 8000 supercomputer in 1991. This was followed by the PARAM 8600 in 1992/1993. These machines demonstrated Indian technological prowess to the world and led to export success. Param 8000 was replicated and installed at ICAD Moscow in 1991 with Russian collaboration.

=== C-DAC Second Mission ===
The PARAM 8000 was considered a success for C-DAC in delivering a gigaFLOPS range parallel computer. From 1992 C-DAC undertook its "Second Mission" to deliver a 100 GFLOPS range computer by 1997/1998. The plan was to allow the computer to scale to 1 teraFLOPS. In 1993 the PARAM 9000 series of supercomputers was released, which had a peak computing power of 5 GFLOPS. In 1998 the PARAM 10000 was released; this had a sustained performance of 38 GFLOPS on the LINPACK benchmark.

=== C-DAC Third Mission ===
The C-DAC's third mission was to develop a teraFLOPS range computer. The PARAM Padma was delivered in December 2002. This was the first Indian supercomputer to feature on a list of the world's fastest supercomputers, in June 2003.

=== Development by other groups in the early 2000s ===
By the early 2000s it was noted that only ANURAG, BARC, C-DAC and NAL were continuing development of their supercomputers. NAL's Flosolver had 4 subsequent machines built in its series. At the same time ANURAG continued to develop PACE, primarily based on SPARC processors.

=== 12th Five Year Plan ===
The Indian Government has proposed to commit US$2.5 billion to supercomputing research during the 12th Five-Year Plan period (2012–2017). The project will be handled by Indian Institute of Science (IISc), Bangalore. Additionally, it was later revealed that India plans to develop a supercomputer with processing power in the exaflops range. It will be developed by C-DAC within the subsequent five years of approval.

=== National Supercomputing Mission ===
National Supercomputing Mission

Supercomputing overview
- Formed: 2015
- Parent department: C-DAC
- Website: https://nsmindia.in/

In 2015 the Ministry of Electronics and Information Technology announced a "National Supercomputing Mission" (NSM) to install 73 indigenous supercomputers throughout the country by 2022. This is a seven-year program worth $730 million (Rs. 4,500 crore). Whilst previously computer were assembled in India, the NSM aims to produce the components within the country. The NSM is being implemented by C-DAC and the Indian Institute of Science.

The aim is to create a cluster of geographically distributed high-performance computing centers linked over a high-speed network, connecting various academic and research institutions across India. This has been dubbed the "National Knowledge Network" (NKN). The mission involves both capacity and capability machines and includes standing up three petascale supercomputers.

The first phase involved deployment of supercomputers which have 60% Indian components. The second phase machines are intended to have an Indian designed processor, with a completion date of April 2021. The third and final phase intends to deploy fully indigenous supercomputers, with an aimed speed of 45 petaFLOPS within the NKN.

By October 2020, the first assembled in India supercomputer had been installed. The NSM hopes to have the manufacturing capability for indigenous production by December 2020.

A total of 24.83 petaFLOPS of High Performance Computing (HPC) machines were put into service between 2019 and 2023. In addition to 5,930 specialists from more than 100 institutes using the newly constructed facilities, 1.75 lakh (175,000) people received training in HPCs. A total of 73.25 lakh (7.325 million) computational high performance queries were run. Seven systems with processing power greater than one petaFLOPS, eight systems with computational capacities between 500 teraFLOPS and 1 petaFLOPS, and thirteen systems with capacities between 50 teraFLOPS and 500 teraFLOPS were installed during this time.

== Rankings ==
=== Current TOP500 ===
As of November 2025, there are 5 systems in India in the TOP500 supercomputer list.

Rank	Site	Name	Rmax (PFlop/s)	Rpeak (PFlop/s)
188	Centre for Development of Advanced Computing (C-DAC)	AIRAWAT – PSAI	8.50	13.17
196	Indian Institute of Tropical Meteorology	Arka	5.94	7.40
251	National Centre for Medium Range Weather Forecasting	Arunika	5.94	7.40
338	Indian Institute of Tropical Meteorology	Pratyush (Cray XC40)	3.76	4.01
469	Indian Institute of Tropical Meteorology	Arka AI/ML	2.70	3.75
500+	National Centre for Medium Range Weather Forecasting	Mihir (Cray XC40)	2.57	2.81

=== India's historical rank in TOP500 ===
Rank of Indian supercomputers in TOP500 list
List	Number of systems in TOP500	System Share (%)	Total Rmax (Gflops)	Total Rpeak (Gflops)	Cores
2020 June	2	0.4	6,334,340	6,814,886	202,824
2019 November	2	0.4	6,334,340	6,814,886	202,824
2019 June	3	0.6	7,457,490	8,228,006	241,224
2018 November	4	0.8	8,358,996	9,472,166	272,328
2018 June	5	1	9,078,216	10,262,899	310,344
2017 November	4	0.8	2,794,753	3,759,153	107,544
2017 June	4	0.8	2,703,926	3,935,693	103,116
2016 November	5	1	3,092,368	4,456,051	133,172
2016 June	9	1.8	4,406,352	5,901,043	204,052
2015 November	11	2.2	4,933,698	6,662,387	236,692
2015 June	11	2.2	4,597,998	5,887,007	226,652
2014 November	9	1.8	3,137,692	3,912,187	184,124
2014 June	9	1.8	2,898,745	3,521,915	169,324
2013 November	12	2.4	3,040,297	3,812,719	188,252
2013 June	11	2.2	2,690,461	3,517,536	173,580
2012 November	9	1.8	1,291,739	1,890,914	90,548
2012 June	5	1	787,652	1,242,746	56,460
2011 November	2	0.4	187,910	242,995	18,128
2011 June	2	0.4	187,910	242,995	18,128
2010 November	4	0.8	257,243	333,005	25,808
2010 June	5	1	283,380	384,593	30,104
2009 November	3	0.6	199,257	279,702	23,416
2009 June	6	1.2	247,285	333,519	33,456
2008 November	8	1.6	259,394	368,501	37,488
2008 June	6	1.2	189,854	275,617	32,432
2007 November	9	1.8	194,524	303,651	34,932
2007 June	8	1.6	45,697	86,642	10,336
2006 November	10	2	34,162	61,520	10,908
2006 June	11	2.2	36,839	66,776	11,638
2005 November	4	0.8	11,379	21,691	3,354
2005 June	8	1.6	13,995	24,726	4,212
2004 November	7	1.4	6,945	11,873	2,126
2004 June	6	1.2	5,652	9,557	1,750
2003 November	3	0.6	2,099	5,098	1,106
2003 June	2	0.4	1,158	3,747	822

== See also ==
=== Computers ===
- EKA (supercomputer)
- PARAM
- Wipro Supernova

=== General ===
- History of supercomputing
- Supercomputing in China
- Supercomputing in Europe
- Supercomputing in Japan
- Supercomputing in Taiwan
- TOP500
