= FUEL Project =

FUEL PROJECT
- Website type: Internet Community
- Available in: 40+ Languages
- Website: fuelproject.in
- Commercial: No
- Current status: Online

FUEL Project aims at solving the problem of inconsistency and lack of standardization in Software Translation across the platform. FUEL Project develops content especially for language users. It works at making technology friendly to user by working as an interpreter. An interpreter who has localized the language of technology and made a glossary of different keywords which is accessible by the user. Currently FUEL Project is working in 40 different languages worldwide. It helps the user to translate and understand different computer terminologies in his own native language. Additionally, the content and glossaries are provided as open source. They are completely free to access by user.

== History ==
FUEL Project was launched in 2008. It was initiated by Red Hat. It was started to create a desktop for a Hindi known user. It was inspired by the thought of making a Hindi user able to understand the language of technology. Glossary of different terms/command, style guide in that language and other content was generated. It standardized the translation standard. The result of effort made other language communities also work with FUEL Project. FUEL Project has organized several language community workshops with the help of local communities, language academies, university language departments, several important organizations and body like Red Hat, C-DAC, Wiki Media Foundation.

== Services by FUEL Project ==
- Terminology
- Translation Style and Convention Guides
- Unicode Text Rendering Reference System
- Guides for Translation Quality Assessment
- Knowledge Base contents
- Translators' Training
