= C-DAC Ahmedabad =

Indian technological institute

CDAC LAW GARDEN, AHMEDABAD
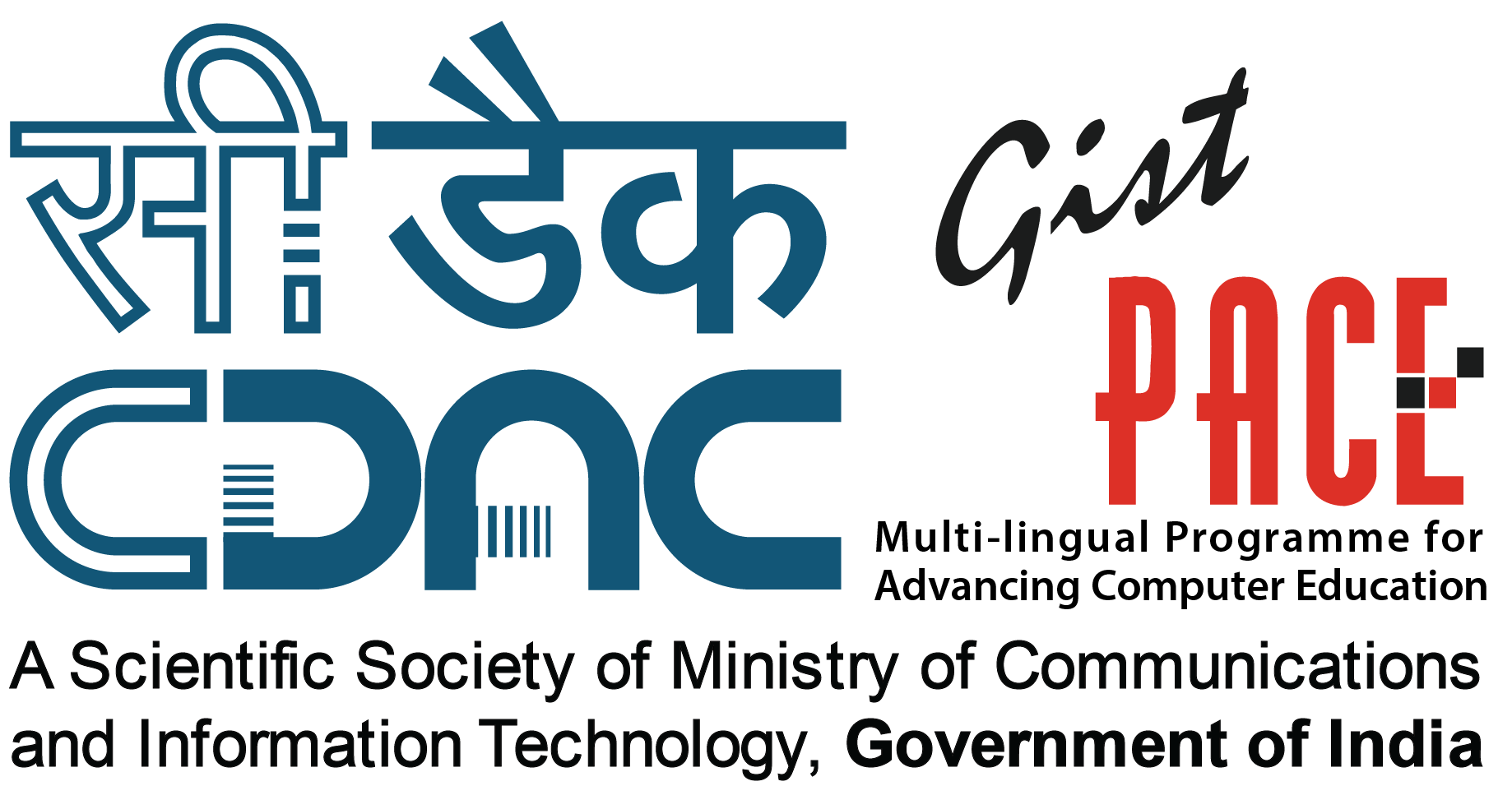
- Location: Ahmedabad, India
- Website: http://cdacahmedabad.com/

The Centre for Development of Advanced Computing (C-DAC) is an institution established in March 1988 as a Scientific Society of the Department of Information Technology (formerly Dept. of Electronics) Ministry of Communications and Information Technology, Government of India. C-DAC is India's National Initiative in advanced computing. C-DAC runs its Multi-Lingual Computing popularly known as the GIST Technology. C-DAC is governed by a Member Governing Council by the Hon’ble Minister for Communication and Information Technology.

The PACE program was developed to impart training in basic & high-end computing using the Indian languages as the medium. This initiative was started in January 1996. This training program has been named Program for Advancing Computer Education – PACE (CDAC PACE).

PACE ATC (Authorized Training Centers) Under the PACE banner, training centers are called C-DAC GIST PACE Authorized Training Centers.

The Centre for Development of Advanced Computing, Ahmedabad PACE Affiliated Training Centre (ATC) of C-DAC, (C-DAC) is an organization of the Department of Electronics and Information Technology (DeitY), Ministry of Communications & Information Technology (MCIT) to carry out research and development in IT, electronics, and associated skills education and development.

Since 1997, C-DAC ACTS Ahmedabad, with its own campus in Ahmedabad, has provided Art and Design education with a focus on providing creative as well as technical education.
