= Appirio =

American IT consultancy

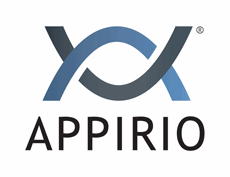
- Type: Cloud computing
- Industry: Software
- Founded: San Mateo, California (2006)
- Defunct: March 2021
- Fate: Acquired by Wipro (2016)
- Headquarters: Indianapolis, Indiana, United States
- Number of locations: Indianapolis, Indiana; London, United Kingdom; Dublin, Ireland; Jaipur, India; Tokyo, Japan; Espoo, Finland; Stockholm, Sweden; Sydney, Australia; Porto, Portugal
- Key people: Chris Barbin; Narinder Singh; Glenn Weinstein; Mike O'Brien
- Parent: Wipro

Appirio, a Wipro company, was an information technology consulting company headquartered in Indianapolis, Indiana (United States) that offered technology and professional services to companies wishing to adopt public cloud applications. This included Software-as-a-Service and Platform-as-a-Service technologies like Salesforce.com, and Google Apps. Appirio ran as a serverless company, utilizing only public cloud solutions and no in-house datacenter.

On 20 October 2016, Appirio announced that they would be acquired by Wipro, an Indian information technology services corporation based in Bangalore, India, for $500 million. On 31 March 2021, the Appirio brand was retired by Wipro and merged into its Salesforce practice.

== History ==
- In 2006, Appirio was founded by Chris Barbin (former Borland Software CIO), Narinder Singh, Glenn Weinstein, and Mike O’Brien.
- In 2007, Appirio established its headquarters in Salesforce.com's Startup Incubator in San Mateo, California.
- In 2012, Appirio moved its headquarters to San Francisco, California.
- In August 2015, Appirio announced that the Indianapolis Office would be named company headquarters.
- In early 2008, Appirio secured a Series A investment of $1.1 million from Salesforce.com and angel investors. Then, the firm secured $5.6 million in Series B funding from Sequoia Capital in July 2008.
- A Series C round came in February 2009 with a $10 million funding from Sequoia Capital and GGV Capital.
- A Series D funding round for $60 million followed in March 2012, led by private equity firm General Atlantic.
- In October 2009, Appirio's Chief Architect, Jason Ouellette released a book titled Development with the Force.com Platform: Building Business Applications in the Cloud, released under Addison-Wesley Professional.
- In April 2010, Appirio was named "OnDemand Company of the Year" by AlwaysOn, selected as a "Best Place to Work in the Bay Area" by the San Francisco Business Times, and listed in Gartner's "Who's Who in Cloud Computing/SaaS Integration".
- In July, 2010, Appirio was featured in The New Polymath: Profiles in Compound-Technology Innovations, a technology novel written by Vinnie Mirchandani.
- In March 2011, Appirio acquired Infowelders, a Salesforce consultancy based in Louisville, KY.
- In December 2011, Appirio acquired Saaspoint, a provider of cloud consulting services in Europe.
- In November 2012, it went on to acquire Knowledge Infusion, a human resources and talent management advisory and consulting services firm.
- In September 2013, Appirio acquired Topcoder, a community of 500,000 developers, engineers and designers that find and collaborate on software development assignments ranging from applications and websites, to back-end corporate systems. CloudSpokes, Appirio's competing platform with 75,000 users, was merged into Topcoder in January 2014.

== Locations ==
- Indianapolis, IN
- Minato, Tokyo, Japan
- London, UK
- Dublin, Ireland
- Sydney, Australia
- Espoo, Finland
- Stockholm, Sweden
- Porto, Portugal
- Pune, Bangalore, India
- Greater Noida, India
- Hyderabad, India
- Jaipur, India

== Competition ==
Appirio ranked among firms like Acumen Solutions (acquired by Salesforce), Bluewolf (acquired by IBM), and Cloud Sherpas (acquired by Accenture) in the market for cloud computing solutions. Increasingly Appirio was found to be a primary competitor of global system integrators such as Accenture and Deloitte.
