= P. R. Pisharoty =

Indian meteorologist (1909–2002)

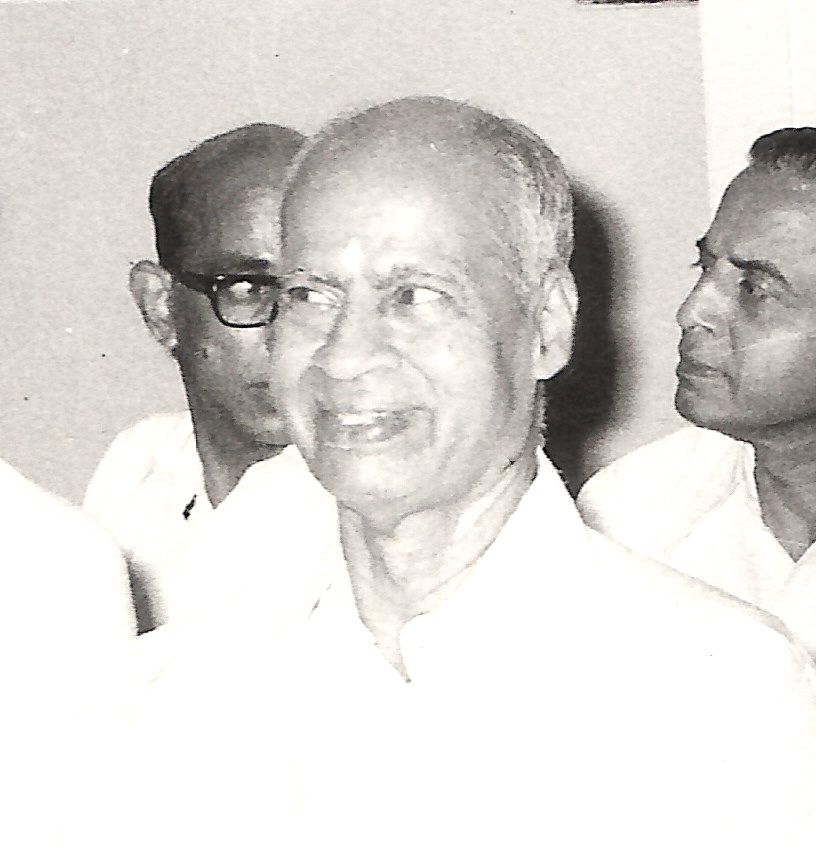
Prof. P. R. Pisharoty

Pisharoth Rama Pisharoty (10 February 1909 – 24 September 2002) was an Indian physicist and meteorologist, and is considered to be the father of remote sensing in India.

== Early life and education ==
P. R. Pisharoty was born on 10 February 1909 in the town of Kollengode in the Indian state of Kerala. His parents were Sivaramakrishnan alias Gopala Vadhyar and Lakshmi Pisharassiar. He had three brothers: Chakrapani, Balakrishnan and Rajagopal, and three half brothers: Vaidyanathan, Rose Vadhyar and Gopalakrishnan. He completed his early education in Kerala. Having done his Physics BA honours from St. Joseph's College, Trichinopoly, Madras state, he went on to do his MA (Physics) from Madras University. He then worked as a college lecturer in Physics at Loyola College at Chennai during 1932-1941. During the summer vacations he used to work under Prof. C. V. Raman at the Indian Institute of Science, Bangalore. On the recommendation of Raman, Pisharoty joined the India Meteorological Department in 1942, where he carried out research on thunderstorms, western disturbances, movement of monsoon depressions, orographic rain, etc. He then joined the University of California for further studies where he worked under meteorologist Jacob Bjerknes. His published two reports titled Some aspects of geostrophic poleward sensible heat and The kinetic energy of the atmosphere. He obtained his MS (in Meteorology) and PhD degrees by 1954.

== Work in Indian remote sensing programme ==
On returning to India, Pisharoty became the Director of Colaba and Alibag Magnetic Observatories in 1959 and Founder Director of the Indian Institute of Tropical Meteorology, Pune in 1962. In 1967 he retired as Director of the Institute of Tropical Meteorology and joined the Physical Research Laboratory, Ahmedabad as a senior professor at the invitation of Vikram Sarabhai. At this point he was entrusted with the job of introducing remote sensing technology to India. He accepted the job. His pioneering experiment of detection of coconut wilt-root disease using Soviet aircraft and US equipment was considered to be the first success in remote sensing in India.

== Positions held ==
Pisharoty served as the Director, Remote Sensing and Satellite Meteorology, at ISRO Space Applications Centre, Ahmedabad during 1972-75. He was a Member of the Scientific Advisory Board of World Meteorological Organization from 1963 to 1968 and later its Chairman. He also served as the Vice-President of the International Association of Meteorology and Atmospheric Sciences, and as a member of Joint Organising Committee for Global Atmospheric Research Programme from 1969 to 1977. He worked at PRL until the early 90s when he retired for health reasons.

== Awards ==
- 1957 Fellow of the Indian Academy of Sciences
- 1978 Fellow of the Indian National Science Academy
- 1970 Awarded the prestigious Padma Shri national civilian award of the Indian government in recognition of his contributions.
- 1988 First recipient of the Raman Centenary Medal.
- 1989 Awarded the IMO Prize by the WMO.
- 1990 Received the K. R. Ramanathan Medal established by Indian National Science Academy.

== Death and legacy ==
Pisharoty died on the morning of 24 September 2002 at Pune, at the age of 93. The Indian Society of Remote Sensing renamed the Indian National Remote Sensing Award to 'P. R. Pisharoty Memorial Award' in his memory. The GPS Radiosonde of ISRO's VSSC is named after Pisharoty.
