= Gufran-Ullah Beig =

Indian meteorologist

- Born: 24 May 1961 (age 65); Maharashtra, India
- Education: Rajasthan University; Mohanlal Sukhadia University; Physical Research Laboratory; National Center for Atmospheric Research
- Known for: Studies on anthropogenic emissions of green house gases
- Awards: 1999 Young Muslim Scientist Award; 2005 WMO Norbert Gerbier-Mumm International Award; 2006 S. S. Bhatnagar Prize; 2007 Maharana Udai Singh Award
- Scientific career
- Fields: Atmospheric sciences
- Workplaces: Mohanlal Sukhadia University; National Physical Laboratory of India; Indian Institute of Tropical Meteorology

Gufran-Ullah Beig (born 24 May 1961) is an Indian meteorologist and a scientist at the Indian Institute of Tropical Meteorology, Pune. He is the programme director of System of Air Quality Forecasting and Research (SAFAR), a network of air quality and weather monitoring stations, which assists in the forecast of air quality and in maintaining an emission inventory. An elected fellow of the Indian Academy of Sciences, he received the Norbert Gerbier-Mumm International Award of the World Meteorological Organization in 2005, the first Indian to receive the honor. The Council of Scientific and Industrial Research, the apex agency of the Government of India for scientific research, awarded him the Shanti Swarup Bhatnagar Prize for Science and Technology, one of the highest Indian science awards for his contributions to Earth, Atmosphere, Ocean and Planetary Sciences in 2006. (Note: Long link - please select award year to see details)

== Biography ==
Beig, born on 24 May 1961 in Jhalawar, Rajasthan, he completed his graduate studies in science from Rajasthan University in 1980 and obtained a master's degree in physics from Mohanlal Sukhadia University in 1983. Subsequently, he enrolled for doctoral studies at Physical Research Laboratory and after securing a PhD in atmospheric physics in 1990, he did his post-doctoral studies at National Center for Atmospheric Research. On his return to India, he joined Mohanlal Sukhadia University as an assistant professor in 1994 and after a service of two years, he moved to National Physical Laboratory of India in February 1994 as a scientist (B-Grade). His stay at NPL lasted only 5 months and in July 1996, he joined (IITM) as a scientist (Grade-C). Over the years, he rose through ranks to hold the position of a scientist (Grade-G) and also heads the System of Air Quality Forecasting and Research (SAFAR) programme as its director. He is known for his studies on anthropogenic emissions of green house gases and his studies have been documented in several peer-reviewed articles. (Note: Please see Selected bibliography section)

== Awards and honors ==
The World Meteorological Organization selected him for the Norbert Gerbier-Mumm International Award in 2005, making him the first Indian recipient of the honor. The Council of Scientific and Industrial Research awarded him the Shanti Swarup Bhatnagar Prize, one of the highest Indian science awards in 2006 and three years later, the Indian Academy of Sciences elected him as their fellow. He is also a recipient of the Young Muslim Scientist Award in physical sciences (1999) and the Maharana Udai Singh Award (2007).

== Selected bibliography ==
- Roy, Sompriti; Beig, Gufran; Jacob, Daniela (2008). "Seasonal distribution of ozone and its precursors over the tropical Indian region using regional chemistry-transport model". Journal of Geophysical Research: Atmospheres. 113 (D21): D21307. Bibcode:2008JGRD..11321307R. doi:10.1029/2007JD009712. hdl:11858/00-001M-0000-0011-F947-B.
- Fadnavis, S.; Beig, G. (2009). "Quasi-biennial oscillation in ozone and temperature over tropics". Journal of Atmospheric and Solar-Terrestrial Physics. 71 (2): 257–263. Bibcode:2009JASTP..71..257F. doi:10.1016/j.jastp.2008.11.012.
- Relationship between lightning activity over peninsular India and sea surface temperature (2010). "Tinmaker, M. I. R.; Ali, Kaushar; Beig, G." Journal of Applied Meteorology and Climatology. 49 (4): 828–835. Bibcode:2010JApMC..49..828T. doi:10.1175/2009JAMC2199.1.
- Beig, Gufran (2011). "Long-term trends in the temperature of the mesosphere/lower thermosphere region: 2. Solar response". Journal of Geophysical Research. 1–7: A00H12. Bibcode:2011JGRA..116.0H12B. doi:10.1029/2011JA016766.
- Beig, G.; Fadnavis, S.; Schmidt, H.; Brasseur, Guy P. (2012). "Inter-comparison of 11-year solar cycle response in mesospheric ozone and temperature obtained by HALOE satellite data and HAMMONIA model" (PDF). Journal of Geophysical Research. 117 (D4): D00P10. Bibcode:2012JGRD..117.0P10B. doi:10.1029/2011JD015697.

== See also ==
- Greenhouse effect
- Air quality index
