= Rishad Premji =

Chairman, Wipro

- Born: 9 January 1977 (age 49); India
- Education: Cathedral and John Connon School; Wesleyan University (BA); Harvard Business School (MBA)
- Occupation: Chairman Wipro
- Spouse: Aditi Premji (m. 2005)
- Children: 2 (Rohaan Premji - son, Rhea Premji - daughter)
- Parent(s): Azim Premji; Yasmeen Premji
- Family: Tarik Premji (brother); Mohamed Hasham Premji (grandfather)

Rishad Premji is an Indian business executive and the son of the former Wipro chairman Azim Premji. He was formerly the Chief Strategy Officer at Wipro and took over as Chairman of Wipro in July 2019.

He was the Chairman of NASSCOM for the year 2018–19.

== Early and personal life ==
Rishad was a student of Cathedral and John Connon School in Mumbai and later did a bachelor's degree in Economics from Wesleyan University and his MBA from Harvard Business School. In 2005, he married his childhood friend Aditi. They have two children. Rishad enjoys travelling and movies and is a huge cricket fan.

== Career ==
After his MBA, Rishad worked with Bain and Co. for two years and then for four years with GE Capital in USA.

In 2007, he joined his father's company Wipro as a business manager.

== Recognition ==
In 2014, Rishad was recognised as a Young Global Leader by the World Economic Forum for his outstanding professional accomplishments, leadership and commitment to society.
