= PARAM =

Indian series of supercomputers

- Formation: late 1980's
- Type: Supercomputers
- Parent organization: Centre for Development of Advanced Computing

PARAM is a series of Indian supercomputers designed and assembled by the Centre for Development of Advanced Computing (C-DAC) in Pune. PARAM means "supreme" in the Sanskrit language, whilst also creating an acronym for "PARAllel Machine".

== History ==
C-DAC was created in November 1987, originally as the Centre for Development of Advanced Computing Technology (C-DACT). This was in response to issues purchasing supercomputers from foreign sources. The Indian Government decided to try and develop indigenous computing technology.

=== PARAM 8000 ===
The PARAM 8000 was the first machine in the series and was built from scratch. A prototype was benchmarked at the "1990 Zurich Super-computing Show": (Note: This is likely the CONPAR 90 - VAPP IV, Joint International Conference on Vector and Parallel Processing, which took place in Zurich, Switzerland, 10–13 September 1990. The statement is difficult to fully attest to other than the referenced article. The proceedings of the conference can be found at https://doi.org/10.1007/3-540-53065-7) of the machines that ran at the show it came second only to one from the United States.

A 64-node machine was delivered in August 1991. Each node used Inmos T800/T805 transputers. A 256-node machine had a theoretical performance of 1GFLOPS, however in practice had a sustained performance of 100-200MFLOPS. PARAM 8000 was a distributed memory MIMD architecture with a reconfigurable interconnection network.

The PARAM 8000 was noted to be 28 times more powerful than the Cray X-MP that the government originally requested, for the same $10 million cost quoted for it.

==== Exports ====
The computer was a success and was exported to Germany, United Kingdom and Russia. Apart from taking over the home market, PARAM attracted 14 other buyers with its relatively low price tag of $350,000.

The computer was also exported to the ICAD Moscow in 1991 under Russian collaboration.

=== PARAM 8600 ===
PARAM 8600 was an improvement over PARAM 8000. In 1992 C-DAC realised its machines were underpowered and wished to integrate the newly released Intel i860 processor. Each node was created with one i860 and four Inmos T800 transputers. The same PARAS programming environment was used for both the PARAM 8000 and 8600; this meant that programs were portable. Each 8600 cluster was noted to be as powerful as 4 PARAM 8000 clusters.

=== PARAM 9000 ===
The PARAM (param vashisht lega) 9000 was designed to be merge cluster processing and massively parallel processing computing workloads. It was first demonstrated in 1994. The design was changed to be modular so that newer processors could be easily accommodated. Typically a system used 32–40 processors, however it could be scaled up to 200 CPUs using the clos network topology. The PARAM 9000/SS was the SuperSPARC II processor variant, the PARAM 9000/US used the UltraSPARC processor, and the PARAM 9000/AA used the DEC Alpha.

=== PARAM 10000 ===
The PARAM 10000 was unveiled in 1998 as part of C-DAC's second mission. PARAM 10000 used several independent nodes, each based on the Sun Enterprise 250 server; each such server contained two 400Mhz UltraSPARC II processors. The base configuration had three compute nodes and a server node. The peak speed of this base system was 6.4 GFLOPS. A typical system would contain 160 CPUs and be capable of 100 GFLOPS But, it was easily scalable to the TFLOP range. Exported to Russia and Singapore.

=== Further computers ===
Further computers were made in the PARAM series as one-off supercomputers, rather than serial production machines. From the late 2010s many machines were created as part of the National Supercomputing Mission.

== Supercomputer summary ==
PARAM Timeline
Name	Release year	Notes	Rmax	Rpeak	Location
PARAM 8000	1991	Inmos T800 Transputers, Distributed Memory MIMD, 64 processors			Multiple
PARAM 8600	1992	Improved version of PARAM 8000. Intel i860, 256 processors. Each 8600 cluster was as powerful as 4 PARAM 8000 clusters.	5 GFLOPS		Multiple
PARAM 9900	1994	Clos network. SuperSPARC II, UltraSPARC and DEC Alpha variants, 32 to 200 processors			Multiple
PARAM 10000	1998	Sun Enterprise 250, 400Mhz UltraSPARC UltraSPARC II processor, 160 processors	6.4 GFLOPS		Motilal Nehru National Institute of Technology, Prayagraj
PARAM Padma	2002	1TB storage, 248 IBM Power4 – 1 GHz, IBM AIX 5.1L, PARAMNet. PARAM Padma was the first Indian machine ranked on a worldwide supercomputer list.	1024 GFLOPS		C-DAC Bengaluru
PARAM Yuva	2008	4608 cores, Intel 73XX – 2.9 GHz, 25 to 200 TB, PARAMnet 3.	38.1 TFLOPS	54 TFLOPS	
PARAM Yuva II	2013	Created in three months at a cost of ₹160 million (US$2 million) - first Indian supercomputer to achieve more than 500 teraflops. Netweb Technologies is the manufacturer and system architect based on Intel processor It is interconnected with Indian Institute of Technology and National Institute of Technology via National Knowledge Network.	360.8 TFLOPS	524 TFLOPS	C-DAC Pune
PARAM Kanchenjunga	2016	Cost ₹3 crore.	15 TFLOPS		National Institute of Technology, Sikkim
PARAM Ishan	2016	Storage 300TB based on Lustre.	250 TFLOPS		IIT Guwahati
PARAM Bio-Embryo			100 TFLOPS		Centre for Development of Advanced Computing, Pune
PARAM Bio-Inferno			147.5 TFLOPS		C-DAC Pune
PARAM Shrestha			100 TFLOPS		C-DAC Pune
PARAM Neel		India's first HPC system that uses the Fujitsu A64fx- NSP1 CPU, an ARM processor with 48 cores and a speed of 1.8 GHz	100 TFLOPS		C-DAC Pune
PARAM Shivay	2019	192 CPU compute nodes, 20 High memory nodes, 11 GPU compute nodes. Cost ₹32.5 crore.	0.43 PFLOPS	0.84 PFLOPS	IIT (BHU) Varanasi
PARAM Brahma	2019	1PB storage. Uses Direct Contact Liquid Cooling.	0.85 PFLOPS	1.7 PFLOPS	Indian Institute of Science Education and Research, Pune
PARAM Siddhi-AI	2020	Nvidia DGX SuperPOD based networking architecture, HPC-AI engine software frame works and cloud platform from C-DAC	4.6 PFLOPS	5.267 PFLOPS	C-DAC Pune
PARAM Sanganak	2020			1.67 PFLOPS	IIT Kanpur
PARAM Yukti	2020			1.8 PFLOPS	Jawaharlal Nehru Centre For Advanced Scientific Research, Bengaluru
PARAM Sampooran	2020			27 TFLOPS	C-DAC Pune
PARAM Utkarsh	2021	Based on Intel Cascade Lake processor and Nvidia Tesla V100 GPU with 100 Gbit/s infiniband non-blocking interconnect	838 TFLOPS		C-DAC Bengaluru
PARAM Smriti	2021			838 TFLOPS	National Agri-Food Biotechnology Institute, Mohali
PARAM Seva	2021	Based on heterogeneous and hybrid configuration of Intel Xeon Cascade Lake processors, and Nvidia Tesla V100.		838 TFLOPS	IIT Hyderabad
PARAM Spoorthi	2021			100 TFLOPS	Society for Electronic Transactions and Security, Chennai
PARAM Pravega	2022	It runs on CentOS 7.x, has 4PB storage, Intel Xeon Cascade Lake processors and Nvidia Tesla V100.		3.3 PFLOPS	Indian Institute of Science, Bengaluru
PARAM Ganga	2022			1.67 PFLOPS	IIT Roorkee
PARAM Shakti	2022		850 TFLOPS	1.66 PFLOPS	IIT Kharagpur
PARAM Ananta	2022			838 TFLOPS	IIT Gandhinagar
PARAM Himalaya	2022			838 TFLOPS	IIT Mandi
PARAM Kamrupa	2022	107 CPU nodes, 10 GPU nodes, 9 high memory nodes, 740 CPU cores, 102400 CUDA cores. It runs on low and high microwave power with active and passive high energy source. Liquid cooling.	838 TFLOPS	1.5 PFLOPS	IIT Guwahati
PARAM Porul	2022	107 CPU nodes, 10 GPU nodes, 39 high memory nodes, 102400 CUDA cores.		838 TFLOPS	National Institute of Technology, Tiruchirappalli
PARAM Vidya	2022			52.3 TFLOPS	Multiple
PARAM AIRAWAT	2023	The combined AIRAWAT PoC of 200 AI Petaflops and PARAM Siddhi-AI of 210 AI Petaflops results in a sustained computing capacity of 8.5 Petaflops (Rmax) Double Precision and a total peak compute of 410 AI Petaflops Mixed Precision. 13 Petaflops is the maximum computation capacity (Double Precision, Rpeak). A plan for expanding AIRAWAT to 1,000 AI Petaflops of Mixed Precision computing capacity has been envisioned by MeitY. Netweb Technologies is the manufacturer.	8.5 PFLOPS	13 PFLOPS	C-DAC Pune
Param System	2024			50 AI PF/1.3 PF	NIC Delhi
PARAM Rudra	2021 - 2026	Based on Intel Xeon 2nd Generation Cascade Lake dual socket processors, Nvidia A100 GPU, 35TB memory, and 2PB storage. Cost ₹130 crore.			Multiple

== PARAMNet ==
PARAMNet is a high speed high bandwidth low latency network developed for the PARAM series. The original PARAMNet used an 8 port cascadable non-blocking switch developed by C-DAC. Each port provided 400 Mb/s in both directions (thus 2x400 Mbit/s) as it was a full-duplex network. It was first used in PARAM 10000.

PARAMNet II, introduced with PARAM Padma, is capable of 2.5 Gbit/s while working full-duplex. It supports interfaces like Virtual Interface Architecture and Active messages. It uses 8 or 16 port SAN switches.

PARAMNet-3, used in PARAM Yuva and PARAM Yuva-II, is next generation high performance networking component for building supercomputing systems. PARAMNet-3 consists of tightly integrated hardware and software components. The hardware components consist of Network Interface Cards (NIC) based on CDAC's fourth generation communication co-processor "GEMINI", and modular 48-port Packet Routing Switch "ANVAY". The software component "KSHIPRA" is a lightweight protocol stack designed to exploit capabilities of hardware and to provide industry standard interfaces to the applications. Other application areas identified for deployment of PARAMNet-3 are storage and database applications.

== Collaboration with Private sector ==
C-DAC mainly outsources the manufacturing of the hardware and design to Netweb Technologies for PARAM Yuva II and AIRAWAT. VVDN Technologies, Avalon Technologies, and Kaynes Technology have joined forces with the C-DAC to develop and produce the PARAM Rudra

== Operators ==
PARAM supercomputers are used by both public and private operators for various purposes. As of 2008, 52 PARAMs have been deployed. Of these, 8 are located in Russia, Singapore, Germany and Canada. PARAMs have also been sold to Tanzania, Armenia, Saudi Arabia, Singapore, Ghana, Myanmar, Nepal, Kazakhstan, Uzbekistan, and Vietnam.

== See also ==
- EKA
- SAGA-220, a 220 TeraFLOP supercomputer built by ISRO
- Supercomputing in India
- Wipro Supernova
