= Azim Premji =

Indian businessman (born 1945)

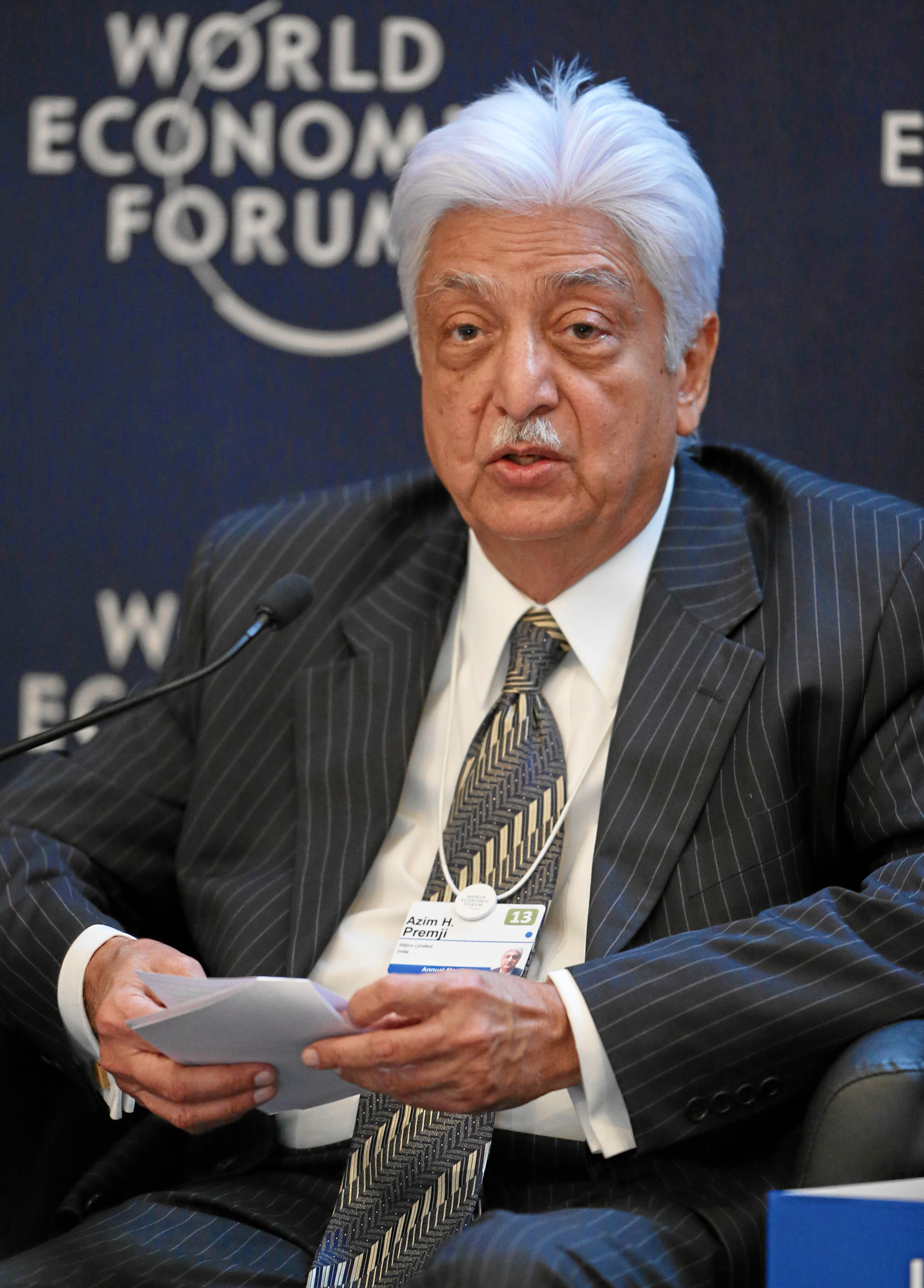
- Premji at the World Economic Forum, 2013
- Born: Azim Hashim Premji; 24 July 1945 (age 81); Bombay, Bombay Presidency, British India (Present-day Mumbai, Maharashtra, India)
- Education: Stanford University (B.S.E)
- Occupation: Founder Chairman of Wipro
- Children: Rishad Premji; Tarik Premji
- Honours: Padma Vibhushan (2011)

Azim Hashim Premji (born 24 July 1945) is an Indian billionaire businessman and philanthropist who was the chairman of Wipro. Premji remains a non-executive member of the board and founding chairman. In 2010, he was voted among the 20 most powerful men in the world by Asiaweek. He was listed among the 100 most influential people by Time magazine, in 2004 and 2011. For years, he has been regularly listed one among The 500 Most Influential Muslims. He also serves as the Chancellor of Azim Premji University, Bangalore. Premji was awarded Padma Vibhushan, India's second highest civilian award, by the Government of India.

In October 2023, Forbes estimated Premji's net worth at $11.6 billion. In 2013, he signed the Giving Pledge, committing to give away at least half of his wealth, starting with a $2.2 billion donation to the Azim Premji Foundation, focused on education in India. He has topped the EdelGive Hurun India Philanthropy List on multiple occasions.

== Early life and education ==
Premji was born in Bombay, British India in a Gujarati Shia Nizari Isma'ilism Khoja Muslim family. His father was a noted businessman and was known as Rice King of Burma. Muhammad Ali Jinnah, founder of Pakistan, invited his father Muhammed Hashim Premji to come to Pakistan, he turned down the request and chose to remain in India.

Premji has a Bachelor of Science in Electrical Engineering degree from Stanford University. He is married to Yasmeen Premji. The couple have two children, Rishad and Tariq. Rishad Premji is currently the Chairman of the Wipro.

== Career ==
In 1945, Muhammed Hashim Premji incorporated Western Indian Vegetable Products Ltd, based at Amalner, a small town in the Jalgaon district of Maharashtra. It used to manufacture cooking oil under the brand name Sunflower Vanaspati, and a laundry soap called 787, a byproduct of oil manufacture. In 1966, on the news of his father's death, the then 21-year-old Azim Premji returned home from Stanford University, where he was studying engineering, to take charge of Wipro. The company, which was called Western Indian Vegetable Products at the time, dealt in hydrogenated oil manufacturing but Azim Premji later diversified the company to bakery fats, ethnic ingredient based toiletries, hair care soaps, baby toiletries, lighting products, and hydraulic cylinders. In the 1980s, in the aftermath of the expulsion of IBM from India, Premji changed the company name to Wipro and entered the high-technology sector by manufacturing minicomputers in technological collaboration with an American company Sentinel Computer Corporation. Thereafter, Premji made a focused shift from soaps to software.

In 2006, Premji set up his family office named PremjiInvest (PI).

=== Recognition ===
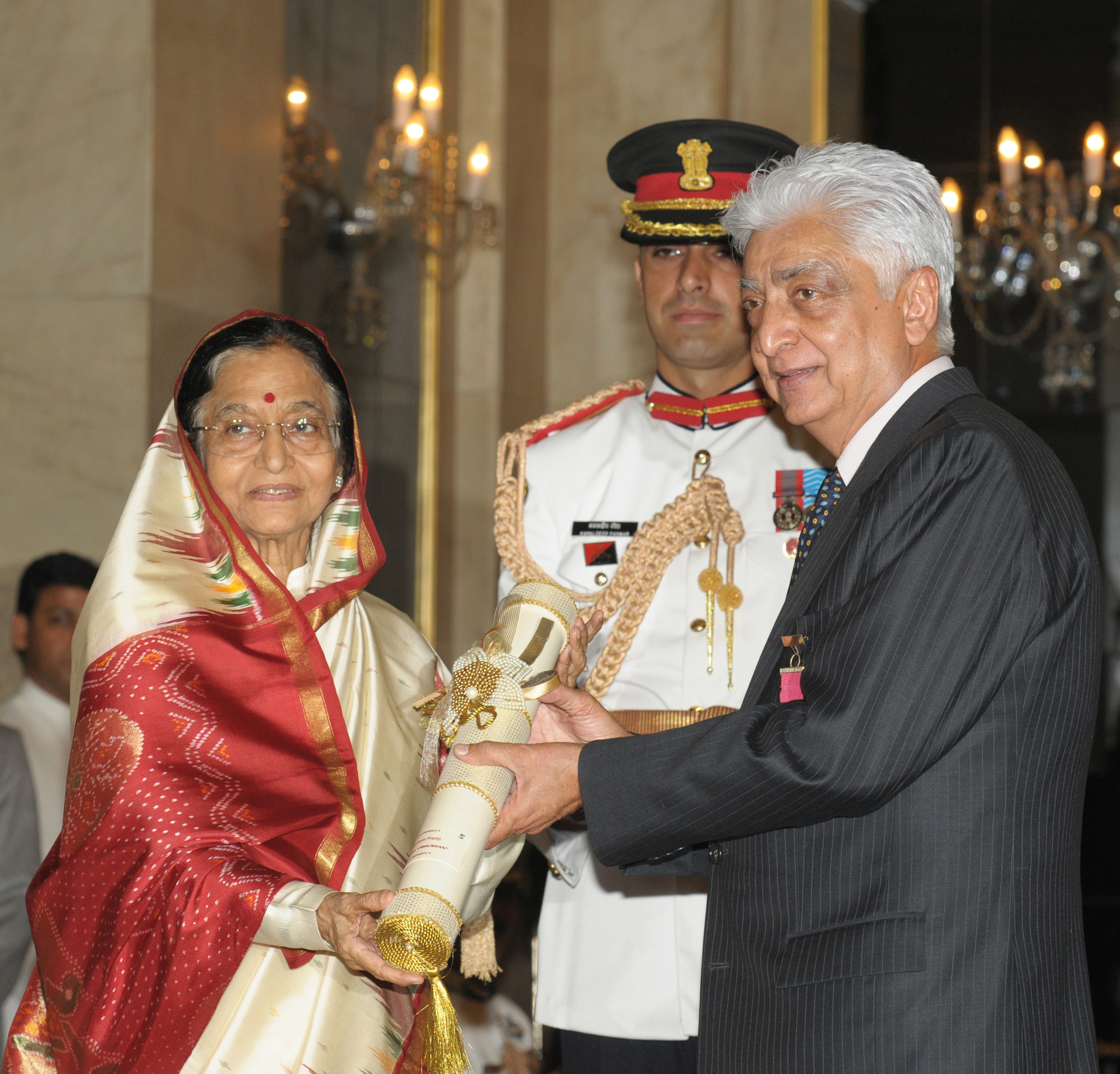
Premji receiving the Padma Vibhushan Award from President of India, Pratibha Patil, in April 2011

- Premji has been recognised by Business Week as one of the "Greatest Entrepreneurs".
- In 2000, he was conferred an honorary doctorate by the Manipal Academy of Higher Education. In 2006, Azim Premji was awarded Lakshya Business Visionary by National Institute of Industrial Engineering, Mumbai.
- In 2005, the Government of India honoured him with the title of Padma Bhushan for his work in trade and commerce.
- In 2009, he was awarded an honorary doctorate from Wesleyan University in Middletown, Connecticut for his philanthropic work. In 2015, Mysore University conferred an honorary doctorate on him.
- In 2011, he was awarded Padma Vibhushan, the second-highest civilian award by the Government of India.
- In April 2017, India Today magazine ranked him 9th in India's 50 Most powerful people of 2017 list.
- In 2018, Premji was conferred with Chevalier de la Légion d'Honneur (Knight of the Legion of Honour) – the highest French civilian distinction by the French Government.
- In 2018, he received the Lifetime Achievement Award at the EY Entrepreneur of the Year Award, India.
- In 2019, Forbes put Premji in the list of the world's most generous philanthropists outside of the US.

== Philanthropy ==
=== Azim Premji Foundation ===
In 2001, he founded the Azim Premji Foundation, a non-profit organization focused on improving the public school system in disadvantaged regions of India.

In December 2010, he pledged to donate US$2 billion for improving school education in India by transferring 213 million equity shares or 8.7% stake in Wipro, held by a few entities controlled by him, to the Azim Premji Trustee Company. In February 2013, he transferred a 12% stake in Wipro to the Azim Premji Foundation. In July 2015, he gave away an additional 18% of his stake in Wipro to the foundation, taking his total contribution to 39%.

In March 2019, Premji pledged an additional 34% of Wipro stock held by him to the foundation, increasing the total endowment from him to the foundation to US$21 billion, which made him the top Indian philanthropist.

In April 2020, the Azim Premji Foundation, Wipro, and Wipro Enterprises committed ₹1,125 crore (US$140 million) to COVID-19 relief efforts. This was followed by an additional commitment of ₹1,000 crore in June 2021 to support the universal vaccination program.

In FY 25, Azim Premji and family (Azim Premji Foundation) donated Rs 147 crores.

The foundation has warned against scam emails which claim to be from the foundation and falsely request donations.

=== The Giving Pledge ===
In 2013, Premji became the first Indian to sign up for the Giving Pledge, a campaign led by Warren Buffett and Bill Gates, to encourage the wealthiest people to make a commitment to give most of their wealth to philanthropic causes. He is the third non-American after Richard Branson and David Sainsbury to join this club.

I strongly believe that those of us, who are privileged to have wealth, should contribute significantly to try and create a better world for the millions who are far less privileged.

— Azim Premji

== Legal affairs ==
Beginning in 2020, Premji was named in a series of lawsuits filed via the NGO India Awake for Transparency. The Karnataka High Court characterized the suits as "frivolous", dismissed them, and jailed two complainants for contempt. In March 2022, the Supreme Court noted an unconditional apology from the principal complainant and closed the remaining matters.

=== Frivolous asset transfer case ===
In 2022, for a case initiated by an NGO , India Awake for Transparency, The Supreme Court took note of unconditional apology of R Subramanian, who through various companies initiated a maze of "frivolous" litigations against Azim Premji and others, and said the ex-Wipro chairman took a "constructive" view by deciding to close it if they do not face "barrage" of future litigations. Azim Premji and others were accused of illegal asset transfers from three companies into a private trust. 'Indian Awake for Transparency' of Mr Subramanian had filed a complaint in a Bengaluru trial court alleging illegality in the transfer of assets worth Rs 45,000 crore from three companies to a private trust and a newly formed company. A bench comprising Justices Sanjay Kishan Kaul and M Sundresh, which had taken serious note of the "frivolous" and "mischievous" complaint filed by Subramanian, perused his affidavit tendering the apology to Mr Premji and others and advised him to start a "new chapter in his life". The case was closed in March 2022 by Supreme Court of India.

=== Labor law violation case ===
In 2024, Azim Premji faced charges in Lucknow related to alleged violations of the Equal Remuneration Act, 1976, stemming from a complaint against a third-party security provider for Wipro. The Lucknow bench of Allahabad High Court quashed the criminal proceedings against Premji, with the court noting that the magistrate had not properly examined the nature of the allegations and that Premji had no direct role in the matter.

The bench observed, “Premji, a distinguished industrialist and the chairman and managing director of Wipro Ltd, has consistently demonstrated a commitment to ethical business practices and social responsibility. "The bench added, “In reflecting upon the character and contributions of the individual summoned before the court, it is imperative to consider the specifics of the case at hand and to also consider the broader context of the individual’s life and work. This court recognises the multifaceted nature of Premji, whose endeavours, both as an industrialist and a philanthropist, have left an impeccable mark on society. The case was closed in May 2024 by Allahabad High Court.

=== Bengaluru traffic congestion ===
In September 2025, the Karnataka government requested the use of a portion of Wipro's Sarjapur campus to alleviate severe traffic congestion on the Outer Ring Road. In a formal reply, Premji declined the request, citing "significant legal, governance, and statutory challenges" as the campus is a private property and a Special Economic Zone (SEZ). As an alternative, Premji proposed that Wipro would fund a significant portion of a comprehensive, expert-led study to develop a sustainable, long-term solution for the city's mobility issues.

== See also ==
- List of billionaires
