= Suresh Vaswani =

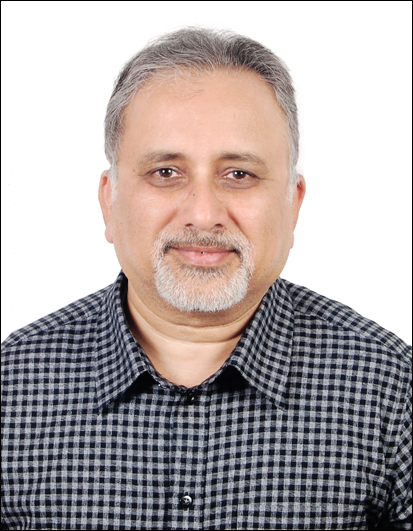
- Education: Indian Institute of Management Ahmedabad; Indian Institute of Technology Kharagpur
- Known for: Chairman – Dell India; Ex Jt. CEO – IT Business & Member of the Board Wipro Ltd.

Suresh C. Vaswani is a Senior Director and Operating Partner of the Everstone Group. He is on the board of group companies including i.e. Innoveo AG, Servion Global Solutions and Omega Healthcare.

Suresh is an independent director with Vodafone Idea Limited and an external advisor to Bain Consulting.

Suresh Vaswani has previously worked as the General Manager - Solutions, Delivery and Transformation at IBM Global Technology Services and headed the global Applications & BPO services business for Dell Services. He was the Chairman of Dell India and Joint Chief Officer of Wipro's IT Business besides being a Member of the Board of Wipro Limited.

== Education ==
Suresh is an alumnus of Indian Institute of Technology, Kharagpur and has an MBA degree from Indian Institute of Management, Ahmedabad.

== Career ==
Suresh has 20 years of experience across global IT/technology majors. Prior to joining Everstone, he worked as the President of Dell Services and Chairman of Dell India; Co-CEO of Wipro IT Businesses and Board Member of Wipro Limited; and General Manager - Solutions, Delivery and Transformation at IBM Global Technology Services.

== Achievements ==
Business Today magazine named Suresh Vaswani as one of the Top 25 Young Business Executives in India.
