= Wipro =

Multinational IT services and consulting company

Wipro Limited

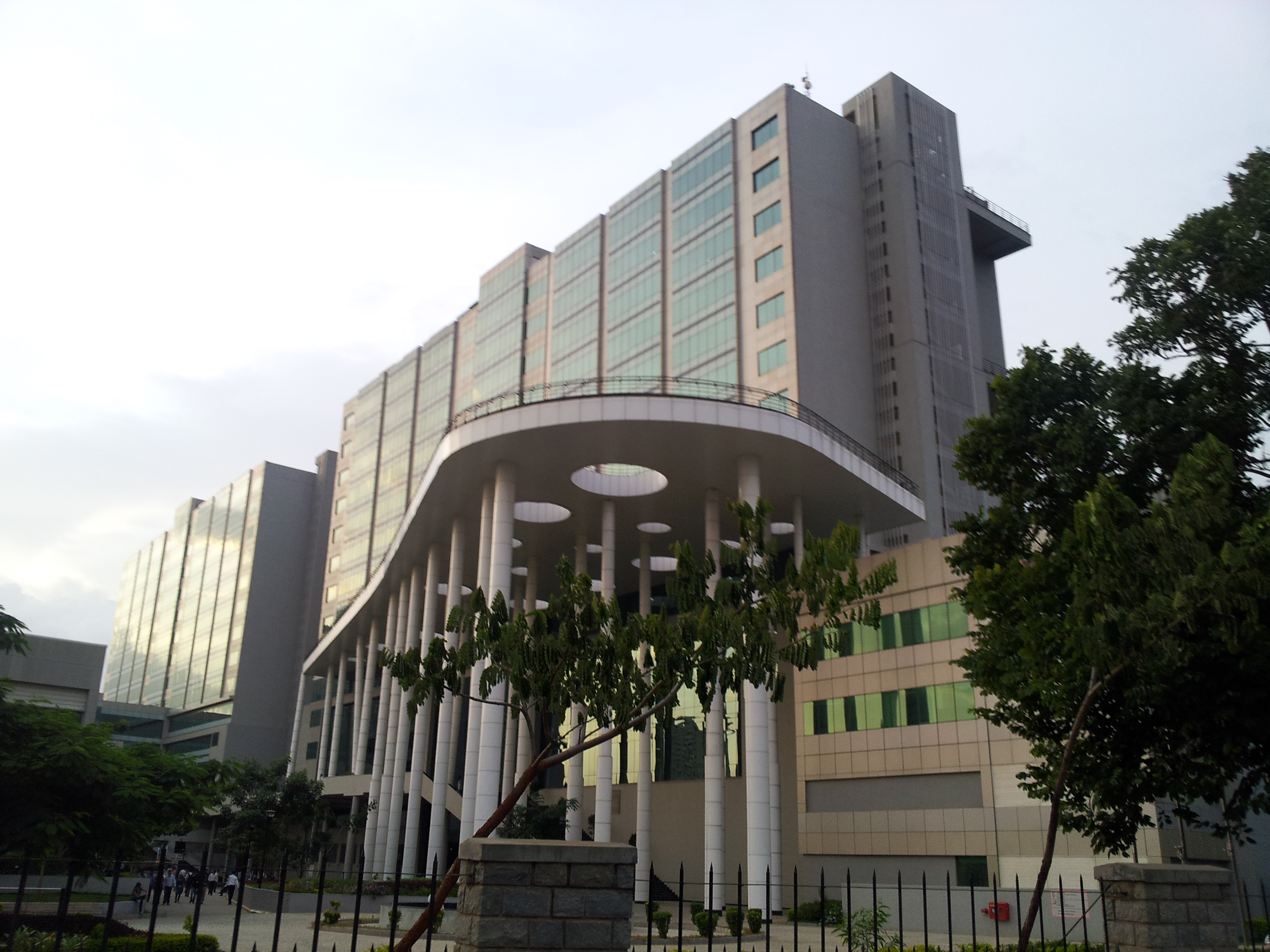
- Headquarters at Sarjapura Road, Bengaluru
- Trade name: Wipro
- Formerly: Western India Vegetable Products Limited (1945–1977); Wipro Products Limited (1977–1982)
- Type: Public
- Traded as: BSE: 507685; NSE: WIPRO; NYSE: WIT; NSE NIFTY 50 constituent
- ISIN: INE075A01022
- Industry: Information technology Consulting; Outsourcing
- Founded: 29 December 1945; 80 years ago
- Founder: MH Hasham Premji
- Headquarters: Bengaluru, Karnataka, India
- Area served: Worldwide
- Key people: Rishad Premji (Executive chairman); Srini Pallia (CEO)
- Services: Information technology; Consulting; Outsourcing
- Revenue: ▲₹96,497 crore (US$10 billion) (2026)
- Operating income: ▼₹17,342 crore (US$1.9 billion) (2026)
- Net income: ▲₹13,265 crore (US$1.4 billion) (2026)
- Total assets: ▲₹141,407 crore (US$15 billion) (2026)
- Total equity: ▲₹88,269 crore (US$9.4 billion) (2026)
- Owner: Azim Premji (72.67%)
- Number of employees: ▲242,156 (March 2026)
- Subsidiaries: Capco; Designit; Appirio; Topcoder
- Website: www.wipro.com
- Footnotes; Financials as of 31 March 2026.

Wipro Limited (/ˈwɪproʊ/) is an Indian multinational technology company based in Bengaluru. It provides information technology, consulting and business process services, and is one of India's Big Six IT services companies. Wipro's services include cloud computing, computer security, digital transformation, artificial intelligence, robotics, data analytics, and other technologies.

== History ==
=== Early years ===
The company was incorporated on 29 December 1945 in Amalner by MH Hasham Premji as Western India Vegetable Products Limited, a manufacturer of cooking oils. In 1966, after Hasham Premji's death, his son Azim Premji took over as chairperson at age 21.

The company changed its name to Wipro Products Limited in 1977, followed by Wipro Limited, a syllabic abbreviation of the original name, in 1982.

=== Shift to IT ===
In the 1980s, recognizing opportunities in computer hardware and software, the company established subsidiaries Wipro Infotech and Wipro Systems. In 1981, Wipro developed the first Indian minicomputer based on the Intel 8086 chip in an IISc lab. The software division began in 1984 with the development of a spreadsheet and word-processing suite but shifted to offshore software development in 1990.

By the mid-1990s, Wipro had become one of India's leading manufacturers of personal computers, peripherals, and medical diagnostic equipment. In 1998, the company reported being the second-largest software exporter from India, and gradually increased its focus on the higher-margin software services business which accounted for the vast majority of its profits.

During the dot-com boom of the early 2000s, Wipro became the largest company in India by market capitalization, reaching a value three times that of the next largest listed company, Infosys. Consequently, Wipro's majority shareholder Azim Premji was the richest Indian for five consecutive years.

In 2004, Wipro became the second listed Indian IT company to report annual revenues exceeding US$1 billion. By 2006, approximately 30% of its total revenue came from product engineering R&D services.

In 2007, Wipro introduced a line of supercomputers known as Wipro Supernova. In 2011, Wipro, in collaboration with the Indian Space Research Organisation (ISRO), developed India's then-fastest supercomputer, SAGA-220, which was deployed at the Vikram Sarabhai Space Centre.

In 2012, Wipro demerged its non-IT businesses into a new private company named Wipro Enterprises. Prior to this demerger, these businesses—primarily in consumer care, lighting, furniture, hydraulics, water treatment, and medical diagnostics—accounted for about 14% of Wipro's total revenues. In 2013, Wipro shut down its hardware division, discontinuing the manufacture of personal computers, laptops, and servers.

In 2014, Wipro set up its design and mobility services business division called Wipro Digital. In 2015, Wipro established its strategic investment arm–Wipro Ventures–to invest in early- and mid-stage enterprise software startups and venture capital funds in the US, India and Israel.

In 2021, Wipro reported that a third of its workforce was engaged in cloud projects, and announced a $1 billion investment in its FullStride Cloud Services vertical.

== Operations ==
Wipro serves clients in industries such as financial services, healthcare, manufacturing, retail, and telecommunications. As of 2025, its service offerings are divided under four global business lines (GBLs), each having different leaders:

- Wipro Technology Services: IT services in cloud, cybersecurity, data analytics, artificial intelligence, enterprise applications, and design, among other domains.
- Wipro Consulting Services: Strategy advisory and business consulting services.
- Wipro Engineering Edge: Engineering, research and development (ER&D) services for semiconductors and embedded systems, software-defined systems, Industry 4.0, and communications, among others.
- Wipro Business Process Services: Business process management (BPM) services.

== Acquisitions ==
Year	Company	Country	Industry	Acquisition cost
2002	Spectramind	India	Business process outsourcing	$83 million
2005	NewLogic	Austria	Semiconductor design services	€47 million
2006	cMango	United States	Technology	$20 million
2006	Enabler	Portugal	Consulting	€41 million
2007	Infocrossing	United States	Infrastructure management services	$600 million
2008	Citi Technology Services	United States	Technology	$127 million
2012	Promax Applications Group	Australia	Analytics	A$35 million
2014	Atco I-Tek	Canada	Technology	C$210 million
2015	Designit	Denmark	Design consultancy	€85 million
2015	Cellent	Germany	Consulting	€73 million
2016	HealthPlan Services	United States	Healthcare technology	$460 million
2016	Appirio	United States	Cloud services	$500 million
2019	International TechneGroup Inc (ITI)	United States	Engineering services	$45 million
2020	4C	Belgium	Salesforce partner	€68 million
2020	Rational Interaction	United States	Digital customer experience consultancy	Undisclosed
2021	Eximius Design	United States	Semiconductor engineering services	$80 million
2021	Capco	United States	Technology management consultancy	$1.45 billion
2021	Ampion	Australia	Cybersecurity	$117 million
2021	LeanSwift	United States	Cloud transformation	$21 million
2021	Edgile	United States	Cybersecurity	$230 million
2022	Convergence Acceleration Solutions (CAS)	United States	Consulting	$80 million
2022	Rizing Intermediate Holdings	United States	SAP consultancy	$540 million
2024	Aggne Global	United States	Insurtech	$66 million
2024	Applied Value Technologies (AVT)	United States	Consulting	$40 million

== Listing and shareholding ==
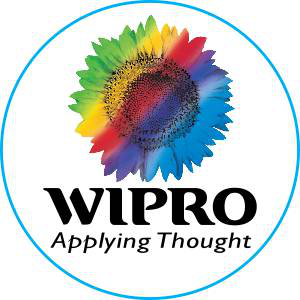
Wipro's logo from 1998 to 2017

Wipro's equity shares have been listed on Bombay Stock Exchange since 1946 and the National Stock Exchange of India where it is a constituent of the NIFTY 50. The American Depositary Shares of the company are listed on the New York Stock Exchange (NYSE) since October 2000.

As of 2025, the promoter group headed by Azim Premji held a 72.67% stake in the company, while the remaining shares were with public shareholders and an employee trust. Since 2019, proceeds from the promoter group's 67% stake have been directed to the philanthropic activities of Azim Premji Foundation.

== Employees ==
As of March 2024, Wipro had 234,054 employees from 146 nationalities, out of which 36.6% were women. It had 26 offices in India and 58 offices in overseas locations.

List of CEOs since 1981:

CEO	Tenure
Ashok Narasimhan	1981–1988
Ashok Soota	1991–1999
Vivek Paul	1999–2005
Azim Premji	2005–2008
Girish Paranjpe and Suresh Vaswani	2008–2011
T. K. Kurien	2011–2016
Abidali Neemuchwala	2016–2020
Thierry Delaporte	2020–2024
Srini Pallia	2024–present

== Sponsorships ==
- Wipro, as a member of the Electronic City Industries Association, partly funded the construction of the 9-km Electronic City Elevated Expressway in Bangalore which opened in 2010.
- Wipro has been the title sponsor of the San Francisco Marathon, Chennai Marathon, and Bengaluru Marathon at different times.

== Criticism ==
=== Embezzlement case ===
In December 2009, Wipro discovered that a junior employee had embezzled $4 million from the company, prompting an investigation by the US Securities and Exchange Commission (SEC) into the company's internal financial controls. In December 2016, Wipro settled the case by paying a $5 million penalty, without admitting or denying SEC's allegations that its controls were deficient.

=== Discrimination lawsuit ===
In 2020, five former employees in the US filed a class-action lawsuit in a New Jersey court accusing Wipro of employment discrimination against individuals who were not of South Asian or Indian origin, alleging that more than 80% of the company's 14,000 employees in the US were of South Asian origin.

=== Salary offer cuts ===
In February 2023, Wipro faced criticism for reducing the annual salary package offered to around 4,000 graduate hires by nearly 50%. Wipro stated that the original offers stood and the optional revised offers provided an opportunity to join the company immediately.
