= Designit =

International Strategic Design Firm in Aarhus, Denmark (1991)

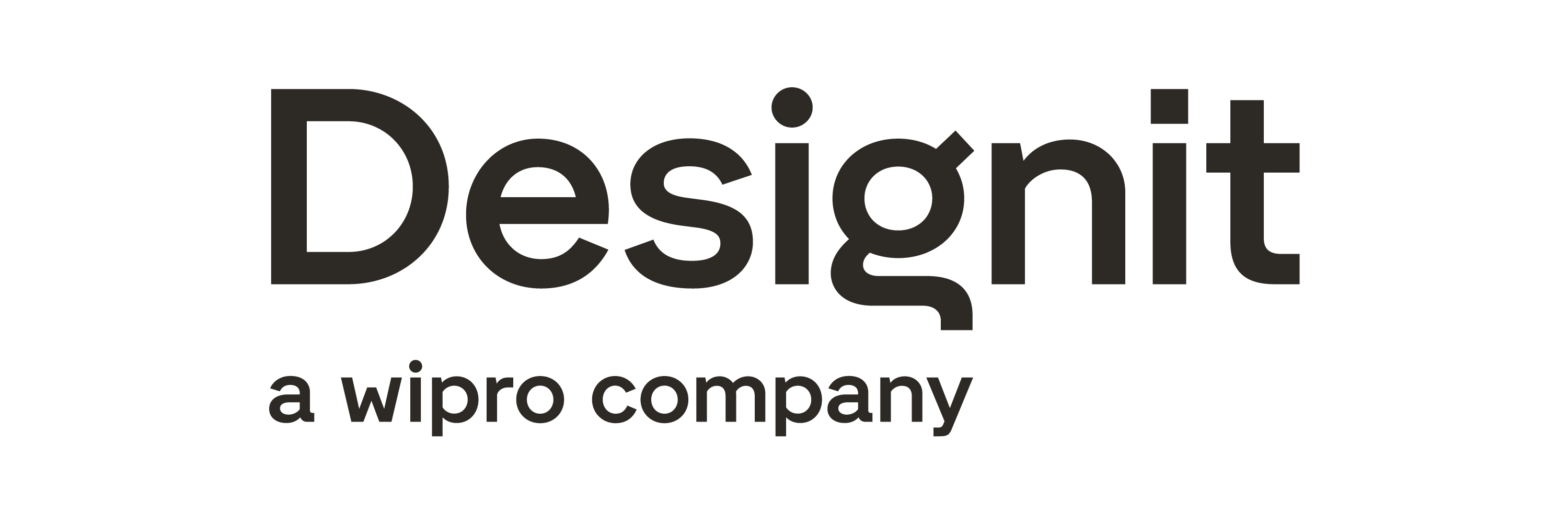
- Company type: Subsidiary
- Industry: Design firm
- Founded: 1991; 35 years ago
- Founder: Mikal Hallstrup (President)
- Headquarters: Copenhagen, Denmark
- Key people: Keri Dawson (Global Leader, Designit) Rob Lederer (Global Chief Commercial Officer)
- Number of employees: 700+ (2022)
- Parent: Wipro
- Website: designit.com

Designit is an international design firm founded in Aarhus, Denmark, in 1991 by Anders Geert Jensen and Mikal Hallstrup. In 1994, David Fellah joined the company as equal partner. Designit headquarters is located in Copenhagen, Denmark, with 17 offices in Aarhus, Barcelona, Bengaluru, Berlin, Stockholm, Sydney, Lima, London, Madrid, Medellín, Munich, Oslo, San Francisco, Tel Aviv, Tokyo and New York City. Designit works in various sectors, including healthcare, finance, IT, telecommunications, automotive and consumer goods.

Designit's work has received more than 100 design awards, including International Forum Design awards (iF), Red Dot and Red Dot Gold, and GOOD design awards.

In July 2015, Designit was sold to an Indian major IT firm Wipro for a reported DKK 635 million (USD94 million).
