= Geetha Manjunath =

Indian Technology Entrepreneur

- Education: IISc; Kellogg School of Management
- Occupations: Founder & CEO of NIRAMAI

Geetha Manjunath is an Indian entrepreneur and computer scientist. She is the founder and CEO of NIRAMAI Health Analytix, a Bengaluru based start-up that provides non-invasive, radiation free breast cancer screening through AI.

== Education ==
Raised in Bengaluru, Manjunath got her Bachelor's in Computer Science from UVCE, and got her Master's from IISc in Computer Science. She holds a management education from Kellogg School of Management, Chicago and a PhD from IISc in AI and Data Mining.

== Career ==
Manjunath got her first job at the Centre for Development of Advanced Computing, where she helped develop as a part of the team, the first Indian commercial supercomputer in the 1990s. Just out of college, she was inducted into the integration team, only to get bored within a year and was contemplating quitting. That's when she was transferred to the research wing.

She then joined Hewlett-Packard Laboratories as a Principal Research Scientist where she worked for 17 years, and later worked as the Lab Director leading Data Analytics Research at Xerox India.

In 2016, she became an entrepreneur by establishing her start-up NIRAMAI along with Nidhi Mathur. NIRAMAI, which stands for “Non-Invasive Risk Assessment with Machine Intelligence”, uses the portable technology called Thermalytix using machine intelligence over thermography images to detect breast cancer. NIRAMAI's technology for detecting early stage breast cancer utilises non-touch and non-invasive breast cancer screening using Machine Learning and AI. The company has raised around $7 Million in funding with few of its main investors being Pi Ventures, Ankur Capital, Fund Dream Incubator and Beenext. The advantage this would have over previously used methods such as mammography, is that the technology developed by NIRAMAI could detect breast cancer in women under the age of 45 as well unlike mammography.

The start-up announced in 2019, that it would leverage Thermalytix in detecting the presence of parasitic worm that causes river blindness, a project that is being also funded by the Bill and Melinda Gates Foundation. She was initially part of the integration team, but got bored within a year and was contemplating quitting. That's when she was inducted into the research wing.

In 2020, amid the Covid-19 crisis, the health tech start-up also came up with solutions that use Thermalytix to detect fever and respiratory diseases to possibly detect Covid-19 infected people. In March 2020, this was pilot tested at a biotechnology company.

In 2021, through NIRAMAI, Manjunath collaborated with Non-profit organization Artpark CEO Umakant Soni and IISc to come up with X-RaySetu. It is an AI-based program that runs on the app WhatsApp to help detect Covid-19 in areas where CT scans and RT-PCR tests aren't available.

Manjunath co-authored the book "Moving to the Cloud" with Sitaram, on cloud technologies published by Elsvier Syngress.

She is the former chair of IEEE Computer Society, Bangalore Chapter.

== Awards and honors ==
- In 1991, Manjunath was awarded the Gold Medal by Computer Society of India.
- In 2009, she was named as one of the top 50 NASSCOM IT Innovators.
- In 2010, she winner of 2010 MIT Tech Review Grand Challenges for Technologists in Healthcare category.
- In 2018, she was awarded the BIRAC WinER Award for her research in entrepreneurship.
- In 2020, she was named on the women in the Forbes List of Top 20 Self-Made Women India.
- Manjunath is the has 16 US Patents for her work.
- She was awarded the Accenture Vahini Innovator of the Year Award from Economic Times in 2020.
- She was also titled as The Woman Entrepreneur of the year 2020 by Biospectrum.
- In June 2021, Indian-American computer scientist Dr. Geetha Manjunath was named as one of the recipients of the Women Tech Global Awards in the "Innovator of the Year" category. Dr. Manjunath is the CEO and co-founder of Niramai, a startup that uses AI-based technology for early detection of breast cancer.
