= National Knowledge Network =

- Abbreviation: NKN
- Formation: 2010
- Type: public
- Legal status: Active
- Headquarters: New Delhi, India
- Region served: India; Bhutan
- Members: Educational and Research Institutions
- Official language: English
- Key people: Dr. Rajagopala Chidambaram Prof. S.V. Raghavan; Dr. B.K. Gairola; Mr. R.S. Mani
- Budget: ₹5,990 Crores
- Staff: 2000
- Website: nkn.gov.in
- ASNs: 9885; 55824; 55847
- Traffic Levels: 400-500 Gbps

National Knowledge Network (NKN) is a multi-gigabit national research and education network, whose purpose is to provide a unified high speed network backbone for educational and research institutions in India. The network is managed by the National Informatics Centre.

== Details ==
The NKN is a hierarchical network divided into three basic layers – ultra-high speed CORE (multiples of 10 Gbit/s; Level 1), Distribution (Level 2), and Edge (speeds of 1 Gbit/s or higher; User Level). Depending on the type of connectivity required by the user organization, geographical presence, and the location of Point of Presence (PoP) of NKN, (belonging to Core and Distribution), connectivity would be provided to the institutes. NKN backbone will typically have 18 Core PoPs and around 25 Distribution PoPs across the country. The NKN backbone will be created by multiple bandwidth providers and the edges can be provided by any service provider.

The network is designed to support Overlay Networks, Dedicated Networks, and Virtual Networks. Advanced applications in areas such as Health, Education, Science & Technology, Grid Computing, Bioinformatics, Agriculture, and Governance will be an integral part of NKN. The entire network will seamlessly integrate with the global scientific community at multiple gigabits per second speed.

=== IP and ASn resources ===
National Knowledge Network has got the following resources from APNIC (Regional Internet registry for Asia-Pacific Region).

IPv6 Segment—

1. 2405:8A00::/32
2. 2409::/28

IPv4 Segment—

1. 14.139.0.0/16
2. 180.149.48.0/20

AS Numbers—

1. 9885
2. 55824
3. 55847

NKN Topology with core PoPs shown

=== IPv6 implementation ===
NKN has got 2405:8A00::/32 IPv6 block from APNIC (Regional Internet registry for Asia-Pacific Region) and allocating /48 block to every connected member institution. /48 is allocated to connected member so that member institute can do multihoming, if required.

=== DNSSEC ===
NKN is DNSSEC enabled.

== Public lectures ==
Lecture	Where	When	About	Participants
First Lecture	New Delhi, India	23 Jan 2013	Democratising information, justice, equality and the rule of law	Delhi University and 500 Other Institutes

== Annual workshops ==
Workshop	Where	When	About	Organizer
Fourth NKN Annual Workshop	JNTU Hyderabad	21–22 January 2016	NKN at the Core of Cyber Space	National Informatics Centre (NIC) and Jawaharlal Nehru Technological University, Hyderabad
NKN Third Annual National Workshop	IIT Guwahati	15–17 December 2014	Next-Generation Network (NGN)	National Informatics Centre (NIC) and Indian Institute of Technology, Guwahati
NKN Second Annual National Workshop	IISc Bangalore	17–19 October 2013	Enhancing Research Collaborations through NKN	National Informatics Centre (NIC) and Indian Institute of Science (IISc)
NKN First National Workshop	IIT Bombay, Mumbai	31 October–2 November 2012	The e-Infrastructure of India	National Informatics Centre (NIC) and Indian Institute of Technology (IIT-B)

== Events ==
Event	Where	When	Organizer
GARUDA-NKN Partners Meet 2013	SAIACS CEO Center Auditorium, Bangalore	25–26 July 2013	C-DAC and NKN
GARUDA-NKN Partners Meet 2014	NIAS Auditorium, IISC Campus, Bangalore	19–20 September 2014	C-DAC and NKN
GARUDA-NKN Partners Meet 2015	NIAS Auditorium, IISC Campus, Bangalore	10–11 September 2015	C-DAC and NKN
GARUDA-NKN Partners Meet 2016	NIAS Auditorium, IISC Campus, Bangalore	8–9 September 2016	C-DAC and NKN

== See also ==
- National Optical Fibre Network
- ERNET
- National Informatics Centre
- Digital India
- Ministry of Electronics and Information Technology
