= Indian Institute of Tropical Meteorology =

Scientific institution in Pune, Maharashtra

- Type: Research institution
- Established: 17 November 1962; 63 years ago
- Director: Dr. A. Suryachandra Rao
- Location: Pune, Maharashtra, India
- Nickname: IITMians
- Website: www.tropmet.res.in

The Indian Institute of Tropical Meteorology (IITM) is a scientific institution based in Pune, Maharashtra, India for expanding research on the ocean–atmosphere climate system required for the improvement of weather and climate forecasts. It focuses on research in tropical meteorology and climate science, it functions as a national center for basic and applied research in monsoon meteorology. It is an autonomous institute under the Ministry of Earth Sciences, Government of India.

== History ==
As proposed in the third five-year plan of India, the Indian Institute of Tropical Meteorology (IITM) was founded as the Institute of Tropical Meteorology on 17 November 1962 at Pune as an individual unit of the India Meteorological Department (IMD), the main organization responsible for meteorological observations, weather forecasts, and detecting earthquakes in India.

On the recommendation of the Committee for Organization of Scientific Research of the Government of India, the Institute of Tropical Meteorology was then made an autonomous institution under the new name, Indian Institute of Tropical Meteorology, on 1 April 1971.

Until 1984, it worked under the Ministry of Tourism and Civil Aviation. In 1985, it was taken by the Department of Science and Technology/Ministry of Science and Technology. As per the notification No. O.M. No.25/10/2006 dated 19 July 2006 by the President of India, the institute has been put under the control of the Ministry of Earth Sciences (MoES) with effect from 12 July 2006.

== Academics ==
The institute offers an M.Sc., M.Tech. and Ph.D. courses jointly under the aegis of the Department of Atmospheric and Space Sciences, University of Pune, India. Apart from degree-courses, students from Indian universities and institutes can also apply for summer or master's internship projects to individual scientists based on their research.

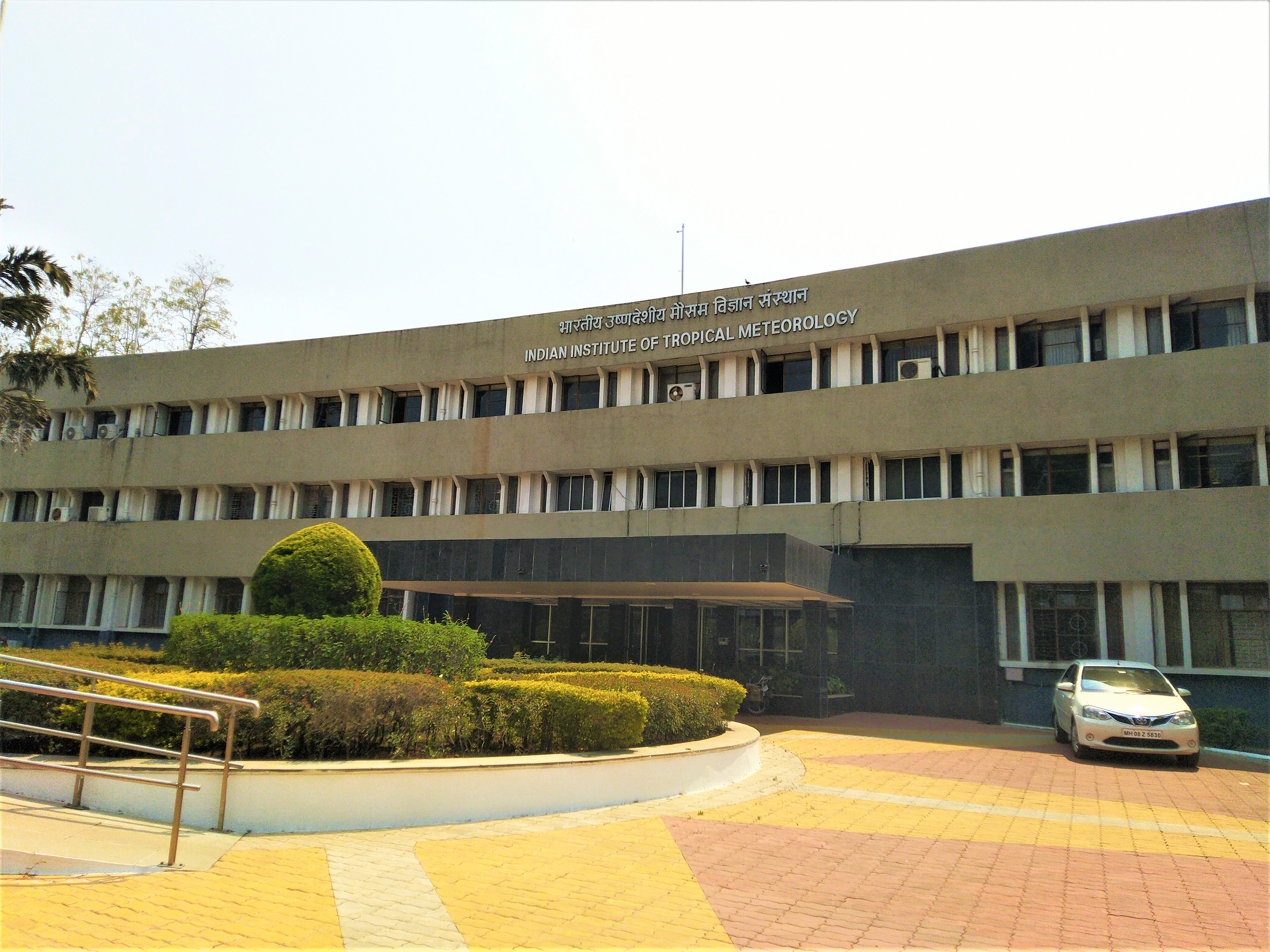
Main building of IITM, Pune

== IITM Projects ==
Monsoon Mission Center for Climate Change Research (CCCR) Physics and Dynamics of Tropical Clouds (PDTC) Metropolitan Air Quality and Weather Forecasting Services Climate Variability and Prediction Lower Atmospheric Research using Unmanned Aerial System Facility (LARUS) Atmospheric Research Testbed

== Computational facility ==
Prime Minister Modi inaugurated a High-Performance Computing (HPC) system at IITM in Pune. The new HPC system is named ‘Arka’, reflecting their connection to the Sun. This system boasts a computational capacity of 11.77 PetaFLOPS and storage of 33 petabytes. This will help improve the country's horizontal resolution of its global weather prediction models to 6 km from the existing 12 km.

Adithya HPC, one of the largest computational capacities of India, is located at IITM. It is a common facility for all MoES institutions. Pratyush or Prathyush (Hindi: प्रत्यूष, meaning "first light on the sky before rising the Sun") is a supercomputer designed and developed by IITM, Pune. As of April 2024, Pratyush is the 3rd fastest supercomputer in India, with a maximum speed of 6.8 petaflops. The system was inaugurated by Dr. Harsh Vardhan, Union Minister for Science and Technology, on 8 January 2018. Pratyush consists of two High-Performance Computing (HPC) units. They are located at two government institutes: 4.0 petaflops unit at IITM, Pune; and 2.8 petaflops unit at the National Centre for Medium Range Weather Forecasting (NCMRWF), Noida. Pratyush uses both units and provides a combined output of 6.8 PetaFlops. Pratyush is used in the fields of weather forecasting and climate monitoring in India. It helps the country to make better forecasts in terms of monsoon; fishing; air quality; extreme events like a tsunami, cyclones, earthquakes, and lightning; and other natural calamities such as floods and droughts.

== Associated researchers ==
- Sulochana Gadgil – Monsoon expert; former senior scientist at IITM
- Roxy Mathew Koll – Climate scientist; Indian Ocean and monsoon expert
- Gufran-Ullah Beig - Indian meteorologist
- Bhupendra Nath Goswami – Climate scientist; former Director of IITM; intraseasonal monsoon variability
- Dr Pisharoth Rama Pisharody - Father of Remote Sensing In India; Padma Shri recipient, Founder Director of Indian Institute of Tropical Meteorology, Pune.
