= SAGA-220 =

Indian supercomputer

- Active: 2 May 2011
- Operators: Indian Space Research Organisation(ISRO)
- Location: Vikram Sarabhai Space Centre (VSSC), Thiruvananthapuram, India
- Speed: 220 TeraFLOPS
- Cost: INR 140,000,000
- Purpose: Aeronautics Study

SAGA-220 (Supercomputer for Aerospace with GPU Architecture-220 teraflops) is a supercomputer built by the Indian Space Research Organisation (ISRO).

It was unveiled on 2 May 2011 by Dr K. Radhakrishnan, chairman, ISRO. As of 8 January 2018, it is not the fastest supercomputer in India. It has been surpassed by the Pratyush supercomputer with a maximum theoretical speed of 4.0 PetaFlops.

Located at the Satish Dhawan Supercomputing Facility at Vikram Sarabhai Space Centre (VSSC), Thiruvananthapuram, it was built using commercially available hardware, open source software components and in house developments. The system uses 400 NVIDIA Tesla C2070 GPUs and 400 Intel Quad Core Xeon CPUs supplied by WIPRO. Each NVIDIA Tesla C2070 GPU is capable of delivering 515 gigaflops compared to the Xeon CPU's more modest contribution of 50 gigaflops. The system cost about INR 140,000,000 to build. The system consumes only about 150 kW.

The system is being used by scientists to solve complex aeronautical problems. It has been hinted that it will be used to design future space launch vehicles.

In June 2012, SAGA-220 was ranked 86th on the Top500 list. By June 2015, it was ranked 422nd.

== See also ==
- Supercomputing in India
- EKA
