= EKA (supercomputer) =

Supercomputer built by CRL under Narendra Karmarkar

- Active: October 2007
- Operators: Computational Research Laboratories, Tata Sons
- Location: Computational Research Laboratories, Pune, India
- Memory: 28.7 TeraByte
- Storage: 40 TeraByte
- Speed: 172.6 TeraFLOPS
- Cost: US$30,000,000; INR 1,800,000,000 (assuming US$1 = 60 INR)
- Ranking: 14 November 2007
- Purpose: Multipurpose

EKA (abbreviation of Embedded Karmarkar Algorithm, also means the number One in Sanskrit), is a supercomputer built by the Computational Research Laboratories, a company founded by Dr. Narendra Karmarkar, for scaling up a supercomputer architecture he designed at the Tata Institute of Fundamental Research with a group of his students and project assistants over a period of 6 years.

CRL became a subsidiary of Tata Sons after their investment into the company. The hardware platform required for initial software development was built with technical assistance from Hewlett-Packard.

== Design ==
To enable design of new software, a previously proven hardware platform was needed. This was provided in the EKA system using 14,352 cores based on the Intel QuadCore Xeon processors. The primary interconnect is Infiband 4x DDR. EKA occupies about 4,000-square-foot (370 m^{2}) area. It was built using off-the-shelf components from Hewlett-Packard, Mellanox and Voltaire Limited. It was built within a short period of 6 weeks.

== Ranking history ==
At the time of its unveiling, it was the fourth-fastest supercomputer in the world and the fastest in Asia.

== See also ==
- SAGA-220, a 220-TeraFLOPS supercomputer built by ISRO
- PARAM series of supercomputers by the Centre for Development of Advanced Computing
- Supercomputing in India
