= E-mahashabdkosh =

Hindi-English online dictionary

e-mahashabdkosh
- Header logo
- Website type: Dictionary
- Available in: English–Hindi
- Owner: C-DAC
- Editors: Ministry of Home Affairs, India
- Website: e-mahashabdkosh.rb-aai.in

e-mahashabdkosh (Hindi: ई-महाशब्दकोश) is an online dictionary website which is hosted and maintained by Department of Official Language, India. This website is intended for general public use.

== About the site ==
e-mahashabdkosh is an online bilingual-bidirectional Hindi–English pronunciation dictionary. In this dictionary, basic meaning, synonyms, word usage and usage of words in special domain are included. This dictionary has the facility of search of Hindi and English words. The purpose of this dictionary is to provide a complete, correct, compact meaning and definition of a word.

== Development ==
During the year 2011–12, the work for the development of E-Mahashabdkosh for 12 work areas has been completed. During the year 2011–12, the work has been completed in additional four areas such as education, sports, culture and railways.
