= Delhi IT Park =

IT Park complex in Delhi

Coordinates: 28.6722859°N 77.2503039°E

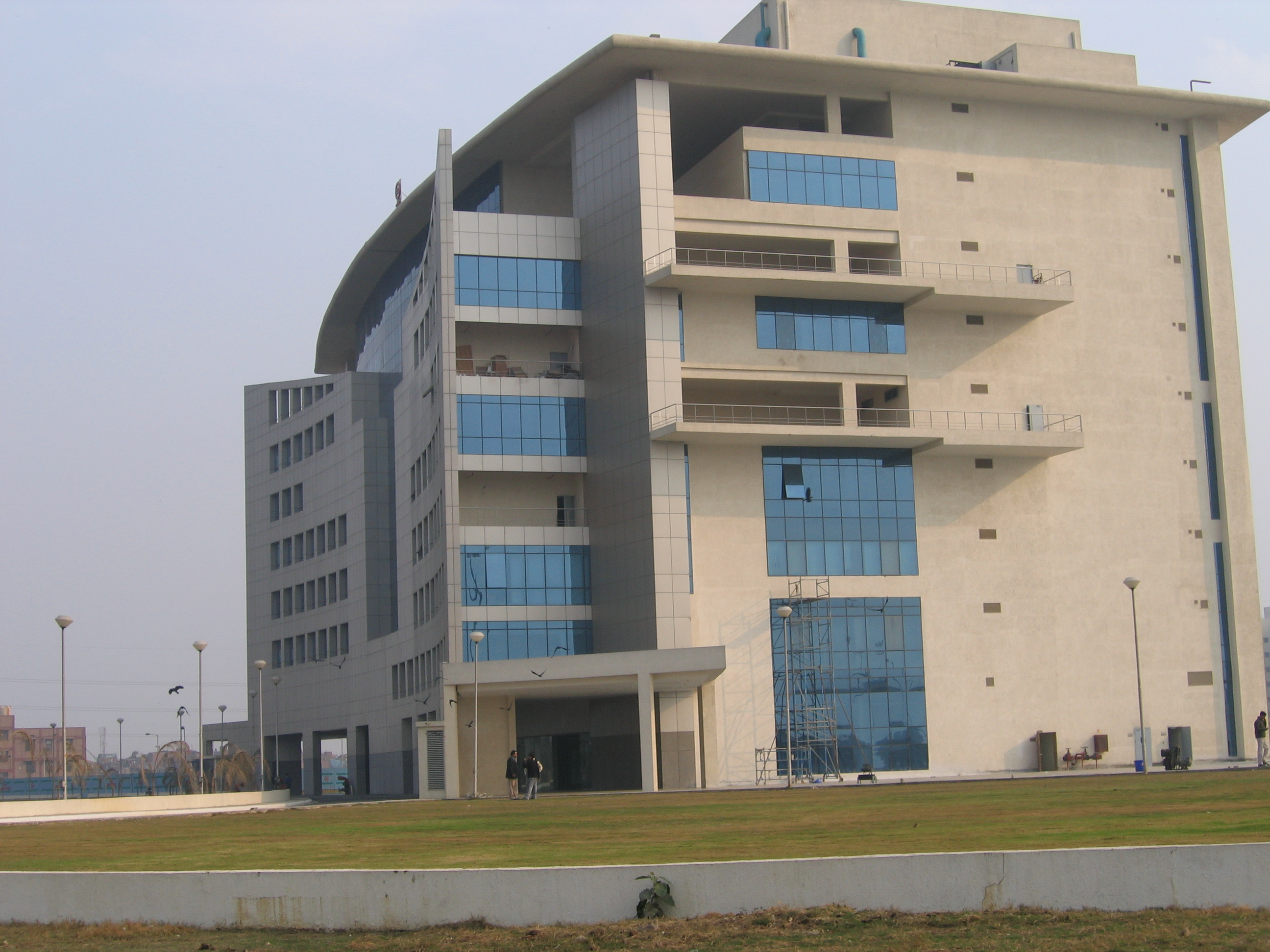
Delhi IT Park Block 1

The Delhi IT Park is an IT park complex developed by Delhi Metro Rail Corporation (DMRC). It is a Software Technology Park situated in Shastri Park close to the metro station. The IT Park complex comprises three separate blocks. The IT Park Block 1 has been operational since April 2005. The construction of the IT Park Block 2 has been completed and IT Park Block 3 has been operational since August 2011.

Block 1 and Block 2 comprise two basements, one podium floor, eight floors, a terrace, and a separate sub-station building for each block. The podium floor of Block 2 has a gymnasium, a conference hall, and training rooms, which are common to all the Blocks.

Block 1 has a parking capacity of 278 cars and Block 2 has parking for 223 cars. There is external parking as well, where 453 cars can be parked.

The companies currently operating in Delhi IT Park are RBS, RCIL and Genpact.
