= GARUDA =

GARUDA(Global Access to Resource Using Distributed Architecture) is India's Grid Computing initiative connecting 17 cities across the country. The 45 participating institutes in this nationwide project include all the IITs and C-DAC centers and other major institutes in India.

GARUDA is a collaborative initiative that connects science researchers and experimenters through a nationwide grid of computational nodes, mass storage and scientific instruments. It aims to provide the technological infrastructure necessary to enable data intensive and computationally intensive scientific research in the 21st century. One of GARUDA's major challenges is to balance research and innovation with the practical difficulties of deploying these advances in complex scientific and engineeringapplications.

The Department of Information Technology (DIT), Government of India has funded the Centre for Development of Advanced Computing (C-DAC) to deploy the nationwide computational grid GARUDA. In Proof of Concept (PoC) phase which ended in March 2008, 17 cities across the country were connected with an aim to bring “Grid” networked computing to research labs and industry. From April 2008 the Foundation phase is in progress with an aim to include more users’ applications, providing Service Oriented architecture, improving network stability and upgrading grid resources. GARUDA will assist to accelerate India's drive to turn its substantial research investment into tangible economic benefits.

The Main Monitoring Centre also called the Garuda Monitoring and Management Centre is set up at C-DAC Knowledge Park, Bangalore. From this point, the whole grid which has now extended even into Europe is Monitored and Managed by C-DAC's young scientists. In India, GARUDA uses National Knowledge Network as network backbone.

== Grid Middleware ==
GARUDA has adopted a pragmatic approach for using existing Grid infrastructure and Web Services technologies. The deployment of grid tools and services for GARUDA will be based on a judicious mix of in-house developed components, the Globus Toolkit (GT), industry grade & open source components. The Foundation phase GARUDA will be based on stable version of GT4. The resource management and scheduling in GARUDA is based on a deployment of industry grade schedulers in a hierarchical architecture. At the cluster level, scheduling is achieved through Load Leveler for AIX platforms and Torque for Linux clusters.

== Grid Access Methods ==
The GARUDA portal which provides the user interface to the Grid resources hides the complexity of the Grid from the users. It allows submission of both sequential and parallel jobs and also provides job accounting facilities. Problem Solving Environment (PSE) in the domains of Bio-informatics, and Community Atmospheric Model support the entire cycle of problem solving for the specific domains by supporting problem formulation, algorithm selection, numerical simulation and solution visualization.
