= Cloud Sherpas =

American cloud computing technology services company

- Company type: Private
- Industry: Cloud computing Services
- Founded: 2008
- Fate: Acquired by Accenture
- Headquarters: Atlanta, Georgia, United States
- Services: Advisory services, License Management, Cloud Implementation, Cloud Support and Education, Mobile application development, Data Integration
- Website: www.cloudsherpas.com

Cloud Sherpas was a cloud computing advisory and technology services company. Founded in 2008 and headquartered in Atlanta, Georgia, it was acquired by Accenture in 2015.

== History ==
Cloud Sherpas was a global boutique cloud consulting that was a result of an organic and inorganic strategy, led by David Northington as Chair, alongside executives Gary DiOrio, Doug Shepard, Toan Huynh, Jason Wojahn, John Argenziano, and others. The original Cloud Sherpas was founded by Michael Cohn, Eran Gil, and David Hoff in May 2008. Cloud Sherpas was a Google Enterprise partner and reseller and implementation partner for Google Apps from 2010 to 2015.

In March 2012, led by a $20 million investment by Columbia Capital, Cloud Sherpas merged with GlobalOne, a Salesforce.com partner. The combined entity went forward with the name "Cloud Sherpas," which became a platform upon which additional cloud advisory boutiques and brokerage firms were later added. Global One was founded by John Orrock, Dennis Wall, and Toan Huynh. In 2013, Cloud Sherpas ranked No. 68 on the Inc magazine Hire Power Awards 2013 list. According to Inc, the firm created over 50,000 jobs in a span of 18 months.

Other notable Cloud Sherpas acquisitions include:

- Omnetic (June 2011): A San Francisco-based Google Apps provider.
- WaveAdept (July 2011): A New Zealand-based Google Apps provider.
- Beloit Solutions Group: (July 2011): A Google Apps cloud services provider from Kansas.
- Devnet (July 2011): A Google Apps reseller headquartered in Brisbane.
- CloudTrigger (December 2012): A California-based consultancy focused on implementation and customization of cloud based CRM.
- Innoveer Solutions (January 2013): A customer relationship management software provider with a particular emphasis on Salesforce.
- Navigis (January 2013): Provider of ServiceNow integration services.
- Stoneburn (2013): Provider of Google Apps resale and integration services in UK.

== See also ==
- Comparison of office suites
- Comparison of email clients
- Online office suite
