= Shastri Park =

- Neighborhood of Delhi
- Location in Delhi, India
- Coordinates: 28.7677°N 77.185°E
- Country: India
- State: Delhi
- District: North East Delhi

Languages
  - Official: Hindi
- Time zone: UTC+5:30 (IST)
- Planning agency: MCD

Shastri Park is a neighborhood located in North East Delhi in India. The name of the area is dedicated to Indian freedom fighter Lal Bahadur Shastri. It is the location of one of the first metro station in Delhi. Delhi Metro developed the area, including Delhi IT Park and a neighboring residential enclave.

== Colleges ==
- Dr. akhilesh das gupta institute of technology and management

== Hospitals ==
- Jag Pravesh Chandra Hospital - provides minimum free basic health care services to the people living in North East District.
