= Wipro Supernova =

Wipro Supernova is the name of a series of high-performance computing (HPC) solutions offered by Wipro Infotech.

== Features ==
The product is offered under 3 segments: entry level, mid-segment and high-end, which have varying performance and storage capacities. The entry level system costs ₹25,00,000; and performs at 1 TeraFLOPS and has a storage capacity of 4 TB. They use the Gluster software stack.

== See also ==
- Supercomputing in India
