= Centre for Development of Advanced Computing =

Autonomous scientific society

Coordinates: 18.551747°N 73.823750°E

- Nickname: C-DAC
- Motto: ज्ञानादेव तु कैवल्यम् (Sanskrit); Only through knowledge one attains liberation (English translated)
- Established: 1988; 38 years ago
- Field of research: High Performance Computing, Multi-lingual Computing and Heritage Computing, Professional Electronics, Software Technologies, Cyber Security, Blockchain, Data Science, Health Informatics
- Director: Magesh Ethirajan (Director General)
- Location: C-DAC Innovation Park, Panchavati, Pashan, Pune – 411 008, Maharashtra, India, Pune, India (headquarters)
- Operating agency: Ministry of Electronics and Information Technology, Government of India
- Website: www.cdac.in

The Centre for Development of Advanced Computing (C-DAC) is an Indian autonomous scientific society, operating under the Ministry of Electronics and Information Technology.

== History ==
C-DAC was created in November 1987, initially as the Centre for Development of Advanced Computing Technology (C-DACT) which became C-DAC in March 1988 and celebrates its foundation day on 17 March every year. In 1988, the US Government refused to sell India a Cray supercomputer due to concerns about India using it to develop nuclear weapons. In response India started development of its own supercomputer, and C-DACT was created as part of this programme.

Dr Vijay Bhatkar was hired as the director of C-DACT. The project was given an initial run of three years and an initial funding of ₹30,00,00,000, the cost of a Cray supercomputer.

A prototype computer was benchmarked at the 1990 Zurich Super-computing Show. It demonstrated that India had the second most powerful, publicly demonstrated, supercomputer in the world after the United States.

The final result of the effort was the PARAM 8000, released in 1991.

The National Centre for Software Technology (NCST), Electronic Research and Development Centre (ER&DC) and CEDTI were merged into C-DAC in 2003.

== Research activities ==
Originally established to research and assemble High Performance Computers, the research of C-DAC now includes:

- High Performance Computing
- Grid Computing
- Cloud Computing
- Multilingual and Heritage Computing
- VLSI and Processor design
- Embedded Systems
- Speech and Natural Language Processing
- Information and Cyber Security
- Ubiquitous Computing
- Bioinformatics
- Geomatics
- Digital forensics
- Big data analytics
- Blockchain
- Health Informatics
- Quantum computing

== Centres ==
C-DAC branches and training centres include:

- C-DAC Pune (Headquarters)
- C-DAC Mumbai
- C-DAC Bangalore
- C-DAC Chennai
- C-DAC Delhi
- C-DAC Kolkata
- C-DAC Patna
- C-DAC Mohali
- C-DAC Noida
- C-DAC Hyderabad
- C-DAC Thiruvananthapuram
- C-DAC Silchar

== Education and training ==
C-DAC provides several courses in the field of advanced computing and software development. Among these are the HPC certification course- C-DAC Certified HPC Professional Certification Programme (CCHPCP). C-DAC organises advanced computing diploma programmes through the Advanced Computing Training School (ACTS) located all over India. The PG Diploma courses include

- Specialisations in Embedded System Design,
- VLSI,
- Big Data Analytics,
- Geoinformatics,
- Artificial Intelligence

C-DAC has also established Centres of Excellence in Information Technology (CEIT) abroad under the Ministry of External Affairs' s development partnership projects.

== Commercialization ==
On 28 August 2024, C-DAC and L&T Semiconductor Technologies (LTSCT) signed a Memorandum of Understanding (MoU). It will establish a program for the commercialization of cutting-edge technologies created by C-DAC in the areas of power systems, embedded software, open-source operating systems, high performance computing, and semiconductor design and development. LTSCT will leverage C-DAC's extensive pipeline of in-house intellectual property (IPs), which includes the VEGA processor, to create global product prospects through application design and validation for Field Programmable Gate Arrays. By facilitating the creation of cutting-edge goods and solutions for the automotive, industrial, information and communications technology infrastructure, and energy sectors, the collaboration to create indigenous ICs and SoCs based in Vega is expected to pick up speed.

== Products and developments ==
- PARAM series of supercomputers
- VEGA Microprocessors, India's first indigenous 64-bit Multi-core Superscalar Out-of-Order RISC-V Processor
- M-Kavach 2, an android-based mobile device security solution addressing emerging threats.
- Mobile Seva AppStore, a mobile app marketplace
- Bharat Operating System Solutions, a Linux-based general purpose operating system
- Anvaya, a workflow environment for automated genome analysis.
- Namescape, the search engine for the Aadhaar unique-ID project.
- GARUDA, India's National Grid Computing Initiative
- TaxoGrid, a grid-based molecular phylogenetics and drug discovery system
- GIST, Graphics and Intelligence based Script Technology
- DARPAN, a real time network monitoring, visualization and Service Level Agreement monitoring tool.
- OLabs, an internet based platform for conduct of school laboratory experiments and assessment.
- Punarjjani, a web based integrated assessment tool for mentally challenged children.
- Shrutlekhan-Rajbhasha, a Hindi language speech recognition software application developed by C-DAC in collaboration with IBM
- eSanjeevani, a digital modality of healthcare service delivery.
- e-Pramaan, a national e-Authentication framework for accessing various government services.
- QSim, India's first Quantum Computer Simulator Toolkit in collaboration with IISc Bengaluru and IIT Roorkee.
- CerviSCAN, a Cervical Cancer screening device suite
- The Artificial Intelligence and Facial Recognition (ASTR) powered solution for Telecom SIM subscriber verification.

== Notable researchers and alumnus ==
- Vijay P. Bhatkar, founding director, recipient of Padma Bhushan award
- Rajat Moona, Director IIT Gandhinagar, former director general of C-DAC.
- Rajkumar Buyya, professor at Melbourne University, formerly worked as a Senior Scientist at C-DAC Bangalore
- Srinivasan Ramani, contributed in bringing the internet to India in 1987 through the academic network ERNET, served as an adviser on UN ICT Task Force, and was the first director of HP Labs, India
- Sudhir P. Mudur, former director of C-DAC Mumbai (erstwhile NCST Mumbai), professor at Gina Cody School of Engineering and Computer Science, Concordia University.
- T M Vijayaraman, head of Persistent Systems's research, formerly worked at C-DAC Mumbai.
- Geetha Manjunath, founder & CEO of NIRAMAI, former member of PARAM development team at C-DAC Pune.
- P Sadanandan, former director of NCSDT (now C-DAC Mumbai).
- M. Sasikumar, former executive director at C-DAC Mumbai and former adjunct professor at IIT Bombay.

== Notable awards and accolades ==
- Award for Innovate for Impact Use, at Global Summit 2025 from ITU AI for Good.
- Manthan Award 2013 for Mobile Tele-Ophthalmology Units, e-safeT, ONAMA.
- Manthan Award 2012 for Interactive Museum, Megh Sushrut, National e-Governance Service Delivery Gateway.
- National Award for the Empowerment of Persons with Disabilities, 2012
- Skoch Digital Inclusion Award, 2011

== Other projects ==
- e-mahashabdkosh

== See also ==
- Supercomputing in India
