= National Centre for Medium Range Weather Forecasting =

Indian government body

National Centre for Medium Range Weather Forecasting (NCMRWF) is a national agency for weather forecasting under the Ministry of Earth Sciences (transferred from its former parent Ministry of Science and Technology), Government of India.

It is a premier institute in India to provide Medium Range Weather Forecasts through deterministic methods and to offer Agro-Advisory Service (AAS) to the farmers. NCMRWF offers research opportunities in Numerical Weather Prediction, Diagnostic Studies, Crop Weather Modeling and Computer Science.

The National Centre for Medium Range Weather Forecasting (NCMRWF) is a Centre of Excellence in Weather and Climate Modelling under the Ministry of Earth Sciences. The mission of the Centre is to continuously develop advanced numerical weather prediction systems, with increased reliability and accuracy over India and neighbouring regions through research, development and demonstration of new and novel applications, maintaining highest level of knowledge, skills and technical bases.
