= Sherpur =

Sherpur may refer to:

== Afghanistan ==
- Sherpur Cantonment, Kabul
  - Siege of the Sherpur Cantonment, 1879

== Bangladesh ==
- Sherpur, Bangladesh
- Sherpur District, Mymensingh Division
  - Sherpur Sadar Upazila
- Sherpur, Bogra
  - Sherpur Upazila

== India ==
- Sherpur, Maner, Bihar
- Sherpur, Sabarkantha, Gujarat
- Sherpur, Punjab
- Sherpur dogran, Kapurthala district, Punjab
- Sherpur, Hindaun Block, Rajasthan
- Sherpur, Ghazipur, Uttar Pradesh
- Sherpur Kalan, Pilibhit, Uttar Pradesh

== Pakistan ==
- Sherpur, Mansehra

== See also ==
- Sherpa (disambiguation)
- Sherpura, town in Rajasthan, India
