= Sherpa =

Sherpa may refer to:

== Ethnography ==
- Sherpa people, an ethnic group in north eastern Nepal and Tibet
- Sherpa language, the Tibetan language of the Sherpa people

== Organizations and companies ==
- Sherpa (association), a French network of jurists dedicated to promoting corporate social responsibility
- Sherpa.ai, a Spanish artificial intelligence company
- Sherpa Capital, an American venture capital firm
- Sherpa (delivery service), an Australian courier company
- SHERPA (organisation), a UK-based project team with expertise in open access and repositories
  - SHERPA/RoMEO, a service to show copyright and policies of academic journals
- Cloud Sherpas, an American cloud implementation and migration company, active 2008–2015

== Transportation ==
- Porter (carrier), often called a sherpa
- Mountain guide, also sometimes called a sherpa
- Leyland Sherpa, a light commercial vehicle produced from 1974 until 2005
- Short C-23 Sherpa, a military variant of the Short 330 cargo aircraft, first flight was in 1982
- Short SB.4 Sherpa, an experimental British aircraft whose first flight was in 1955
- Super Sherpa, a 250 cc dual-purpose motorcycle produced by Kawasaki
- A series of military trucks produced by Renault Trucks Defense, including the Sherpa Light
- UP Sherpa Bi, a German paraglider design by UP International
- SHERPA (space tug), a kick start space tug and satellite dispenser

== Other uses ==
- Agelena sherpa, a spider of family Agelenidae
- Sherpa (book), a 2022 book by Pradeep Bashyal and Ankit Babu Adhikari
- Sherpa (emissary), the personal representative of a head of state or government in the G20 or G7
- Sherpa (fabric), a fabric with a pile on one side
- Sherpa (film), a 2015 documentary film
- Sherpa Fire, a 2016 wildfire that burned in Santa Barbara County, California
- Sherpa Glacier, an alpine glacier in Washington state
- Sherpa Peak, a mountain in Washington state
- Sherpa (political consultant), a political consultant guiding a nominee to Senate confirmation
- Sherpa (surname), surname originating from the Himalayan region
- Yahoo Sherpa, a distributed key value datastore developed by Yahoo!

== See also ==
- Sherpur (disambiguation)
