= Kadiadara =

- village
- Country: India
- State: Gujarat
- District: Sabar Kantha

Languages
  - Official: Gujarati, Hindi
- Time zone: UTC+5:30 (IST)
- ISO 3166 code: RJ-IN
- Vehicle registration: GJ-09
- Coastline: 0 kilometres (0 mi)
- Nearest city: Idar
- Website: gujaratindia.com

Kadiadara is a small village in the Indian state of Gujarat, near the city of Idar. Kadiadara is located about 46 km north east of Himatnagar and 25 km from Gujarat's border with Rajasthan.
