= Rao Sonag =

Rao of Idar from 1257 to 1275

Rao Sonag was a Rajput king belonging to the Rathore clan, and the first Rao of Idar. His father was Rao Sheoji and his mother hailed from the Chavda clan of Rajputs.

Rao Sonagji was a brother of Rao Asthan, ruler of Khed. The two brothers together conquered the town of Idar in 1257 and Sonag settled there. He died in 1275, after him his son Rao Emalji ruled idar for 2 years, died early, his descendants were called Emaliya Raos who were given independent jagirs of Ahmednagar and vijapur later, after him idar's throne went to Rao Sonagji's younger son Dhavalmalji. Sonangji's descendants are known as "Idariya Rathores."
