= Sherpa.ai =

Spanish technology company

Sherpa
- Industry: Artificial intelligence
- Founded: 2012
- Founder: Xabi Uribe-Etxebarria
- Headquarters: Erandio and Silicon Valley, Spain, United States
- Key people: Tom Gruber, Chris Shipley, Joanna Hoffman
- Website: sherpa.ai

Sherpa (also known as Sherpa.ai) is a Spanish artificial intelligence company specializing in predictive conversational digital assistants. It was founded by Xabi Uribe-Etxebarria in 2012 and is based in Erandio and Silicon Valley. In 2018, Fortune magazine included Sherpa in its ranking of the 100 best artificial intelligence companies.

== Trajectory ==
The company was created in 2012 with the aim to develop a predictive conversational digital assistant based on artificial intelligence algorithms. The product was aimed at corporate clients to provide consultancy in artificial intelligence. They are based in Erandio (Vizcaya, Spain) and Silicon Valley (California, United States)They are an ISO/IEC 27001 certified company.

In 2016, they obtained $6.5 million in a round of funding from Mundi Ventures and other private investors. In a second round in 2019, they obtained $8.5 million; and in 2021, they secured an additional $8.5 million in funding from Mundi Ventures, Ekarpen, Marcelo Gigliani of Apax Digital, and Alex Cruz of British Airways.

== Products ==
Sherpa's first product was a mobile phone application of the same name. Their products are predictive conversational digital assistants that learn from the user's context to anticipate their needs. Sherpa uses 100,000 parameters from each user to answer requests. Additionally, they have developed a multi-purpose recommendation system for news, music, and filtering important emails.

Among their products are free applications for smartphones and tablets such as Sherpa Assistant and Sherpa News which have garnered over 3 million downloads. Sherpa came pre-installed on Samsung smartphones as the default digital assistant, until Samsung Electronics launched Bixby.

Their AI assistants and operating systems are embedded in cars, smartphones, home speakers, and appliances. Sherpa also has agreements with companies such as Porsche and Samsung.

== Work team ==
By 2018, Sherpa had 35 employees, most of whom were experts in artificial intelligence. According to the publication Innova Spain, Sherpa works with researchers and research centers at the University of Granada, Deusto, the University of the Basque Country and Mondragón. Some of their advisors include Alex Cruz, president and CEO of British Airways, and Chris Shipley, who was considered the most influential woman in Silicon Valley according to the San Jose Business Journal.

Tom Gruber, co-founder and former CTO of Siri, joined Sherpa's working group in 2019. One year later, Joanna Hoffman joined as an advisor.

== See also ==
- Artificial intelligence
