= Sherpur Government College =

College in Bangladesh

Coordinates: 25.0207°N 90.0131°E

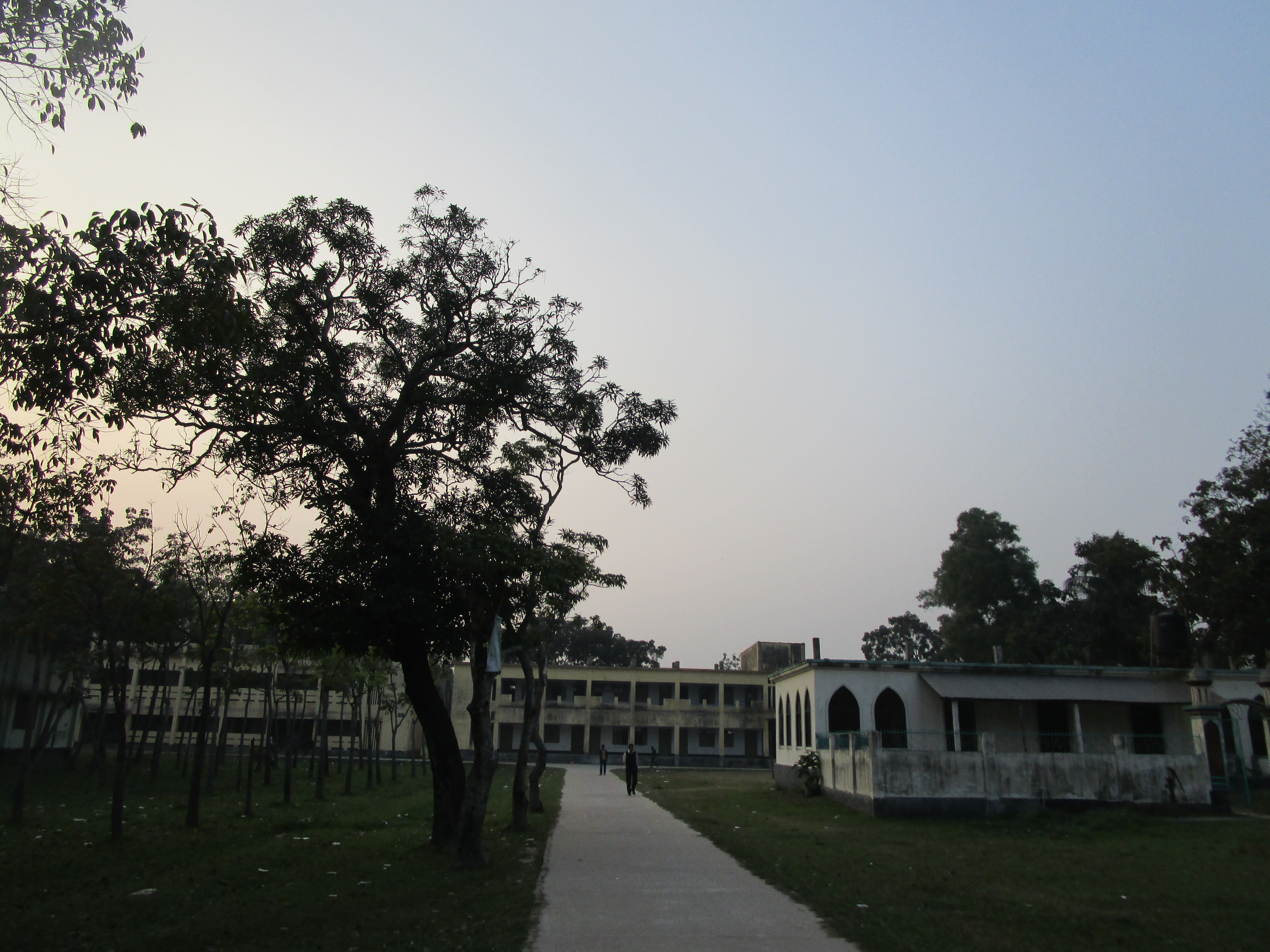
Sherpur Govt College

Sherpur Government College is a college in Sherpur District. It is situated at Bugraksha in Sherpur Sadar Upazila.

It was established in 1964 as Sherpur College. Initially, until the college's present 10.5-acre (4.2 ha) campus was ready, classes were taught at GK Pilot High School. The college became affiliated to Dacca University in the 1966-1967 academic year.

In 1980, the college was nationalized, becoming Sherpur Government College. It is presently affiliated with National University of Bangladesh. As of 2024, enrollment is over 14,800, from higher secondary to master's level.
