= Idar, Gujarat =

Idar
- town
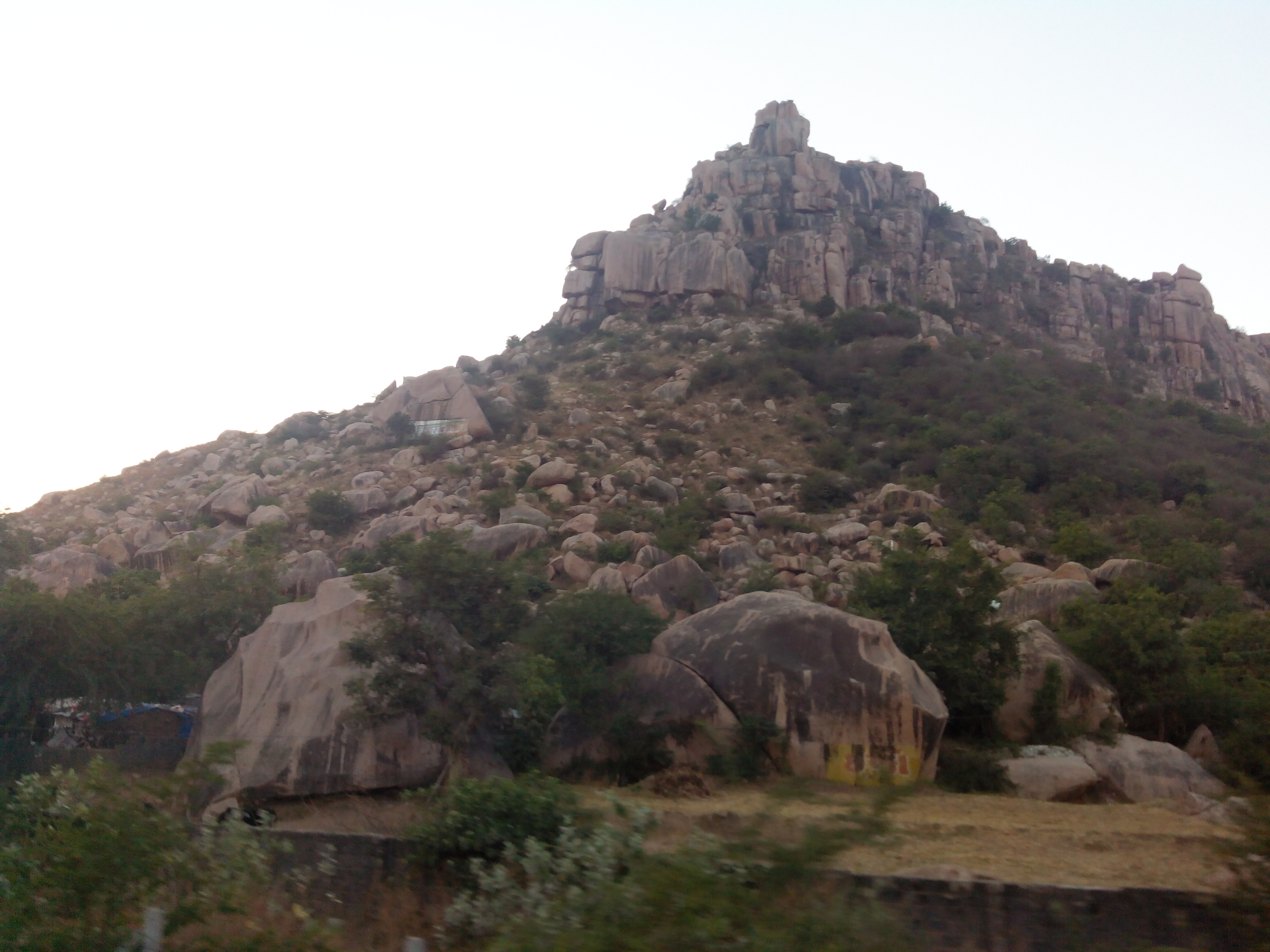
- Idar hills

- Location in Gujarat, India
- Coordinates: 23.839°N 73.002°E
- Country: India
- State: Gujarat
- District: Sabarkantha district
- Founder: Shrinivash Vanzara
- Elevation: 195 m (640 ft)

Population (2001)
  - Total: 295,971

Languages
  - Official: Gujarati, Hindi
- Time zone: UTC+5:30 (IST)
- Postal code: 383430

Idar is a town in Sabarkantha district, Gujarat, India. It is known for the manufacture of handmade wooden toys, tiles, its temples and various beautiful architectural monuments on its hills, and its historical background. Idar is at the southern end of the Aravalli Range.

== Etymology ==
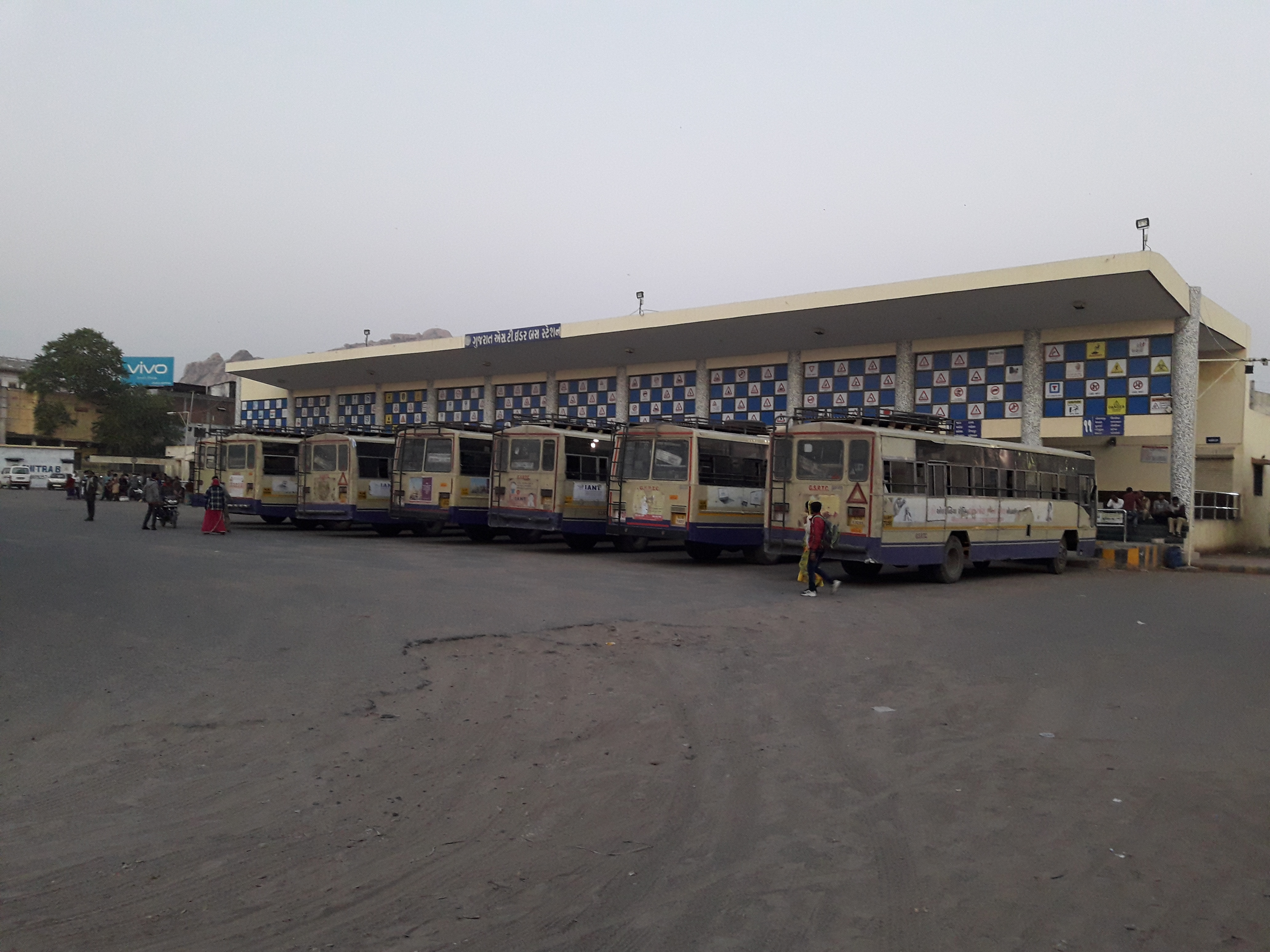
Idar Bus Station

Idar was historically named Ilvadurg, which means the fortress of Ilvan. Its name was later corrupted into Idar. It was mentioned in Padma Purana as well as in the Mahabharata as Ila.

== History ==
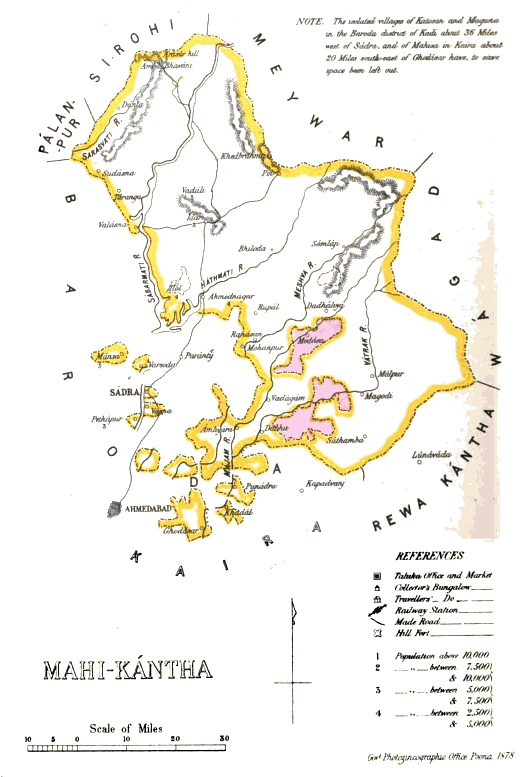
Idar in map of Mahi Kantha Agency, British India, 1878

=== Legends ===
The town is mentioned in Mahabharata and Bhavishottar Puran as 'Ilvadurg'. The exact date of its origin is not known; but it is believed that it came into existence at the time when Yudhishthira was ruling over Hastinapur at the end of the Kurukshetra War of Mahabharata.

According to tradition, Idar has been celebrated from the earliest times. Even in the past cycle, yuga, it was known, and in the present cycle, before the days of Vikram, the legendary king Veni Vachh Raj ruled at Idar, the possessor of a golden figure which helped him to build the hillfort and its reservoirs. His queen was a Nagputri, the daughter of a snake-king of the under world, whither, the legend says, she and her consort betook themselves when the queen found that men were mortal.

=== Ancient history ===
The first clear tradition shows Idar in the possession of Bhils. Raja Mandlik Bhil was King of Ider. After the fall of Vallabhi in 770, Kamalavati or Pushpavati, one of the wives of Maitraka king Shiladitya was at Ambaji to fulfil a vow. She heard news and took refuge in a cave in the mountains and there gave birth to a son called Gruhaditya or 'Goha', meaning cave-born. Making over the child to a Brahmin woman, the queen followed her husband through the fire. The young prince, of a daring character and adventurous spirit, soon passed out of his guardian's hands, and joining the Idar Bhils was by them chosen king. Whether in sport or earnest, the election was real, and for several generations his successors ruled in Idar. At last Nagaditya or Aparajita the eighth prince was killed by his subjects. He left a son named Bappa Rawal who never succeeded to his father's chiefship, but became the founder of Mewar dynasty. The Chinese pilgrim Xuanzang (640) mentions a place which he calls O-clia-li, the Chinese way of writing Vadali, a village nearby. British General Cunningham identified this place with Idar. He further noted that in the eleventh century Vadali or Vadari was the capital of a family of chiefs claiming descent from Raja Bhara Gupta, whom the General believed to be the same as the above-mentioned Bappa. According to tradition, Idar was refounded by Parihar Rajputs, who, subject to Chittor, ruled there for several generations. Towards the close of the twelfth century, the Idar chief took part with Prithviraj Chauhan, king of Delhi, against the Ghurid Sultanate and was killed in the Battles of Tarain (1192). Idar then fell into the hands of a Bhil king named Hathi Sord who founded the Sord dynasty and was succeeded by his son Samalio Bhil. The latter was killed by a Rathod prince named Sonangji, who took occupied Idar, and became the founder of the dynasty of the Raos who ruled there for several generations. After numerous changes of fortune and many struggles with the Muslims, the Raos had at last to leave Idar, and established in pol, called as raos of pol, one branch called emaliya rao tracing its lineage to Rao Emalji elder son of Rao sonangji went to siroji and were made feudal lord of chandana jagir, another branch chappaniya were granted namla jagir in mewar. in 1728, idar was succeeded by the Rathod dynasty from Marwar.

=== Modern history ===
Raja Anand Singh, with the help of his brother Rai Singh and a few horseman from Palanpur and the Kolis of Gadhwara, he established himself in Idar without difficulty in 1728 or 1729. He died in 1753. Then HH Maharaja Rajendra Singh became the ruler of princely state of Idar. In 1924 it was made part of the Western India States Agency. It was transferred to the Rajputana states in the early 1940s. In 1949 it was dissolved and split between Sabarkantha and Mehsana districts which were at that point in Bombay State. Both these districts became part of Gujarat when it was formed in 1960.

== Notable people ==
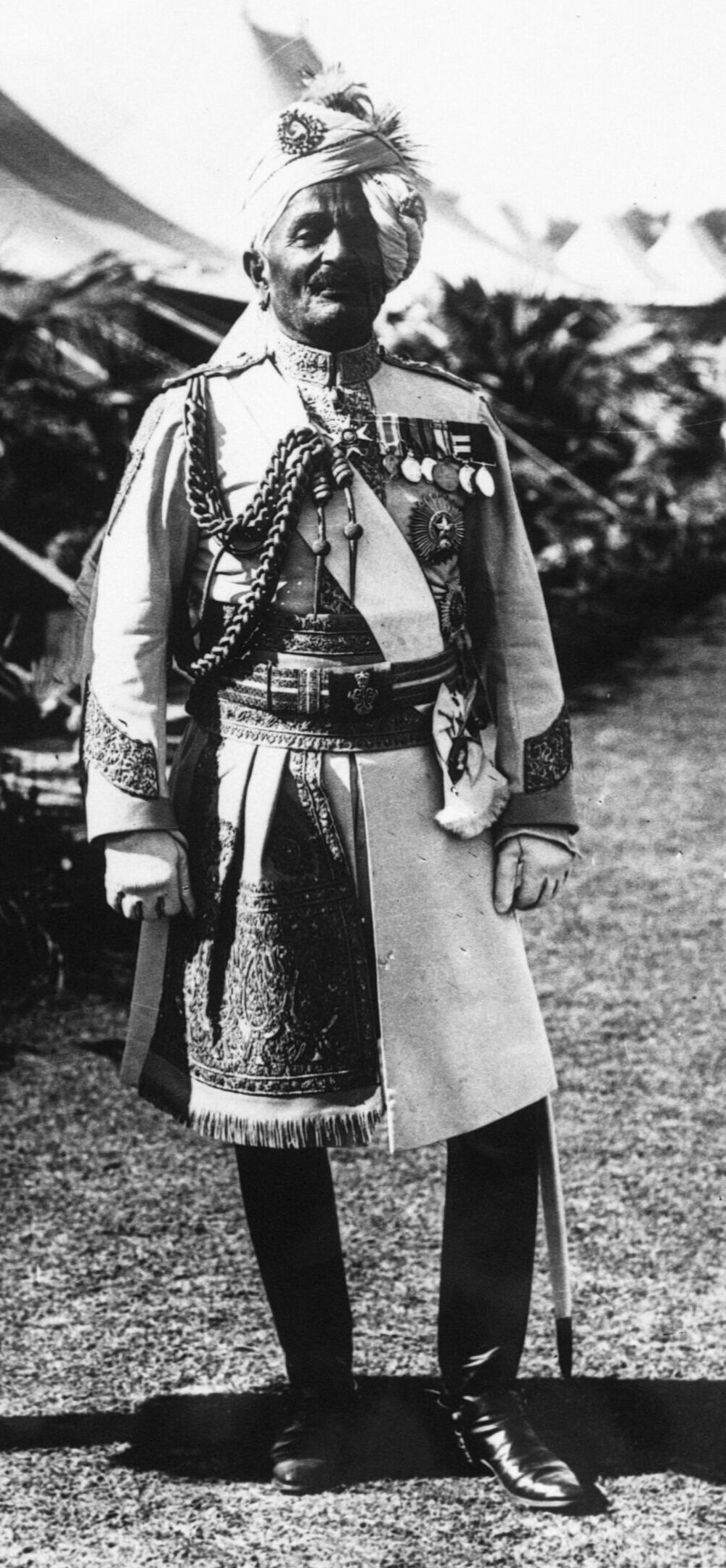
Pratap Singh in 1914

- Lieutenant-General Maharaja Sri Sir Pratap Singh Sahib Bahadur of Idar GCB GCSI GCVO (22 October 1845 – 4 September 1922), commonly known as Sir Pratap, was a career British Indian Army officer, Maharaja of the princely state of Idar (Gujarat). Sir Pratap commanded his regiments heroically during the First World War in France and Flanders. He travelled to Europe often and was close to Queen Victoria and her family.
- Pannalal Patel (7 May 1912 – 6 April 1989) who was a Gujarati author. He was the recipient of Jnanpith Award in 1985 and Ranjitram Suvarna Chandrak in 1950. Pannalal used to write novels in a dialect which is generally spoken in Sabarkantha district. He was educated at Sir Pratap High School of Idar.
- Umashankar Joshi (12 July 1911 – 19 December 1988) was an eminent poet, scholar, and writer. He received the Jnanpith Award in 1967 and Ranjitram Suvarna Chandrak in 1939 for his contribution to Indian, especially Gujarati literature. He was also an alumnus of The Sir Pratap High School of Idar.
- Arvind Trivedi, an Indian actor. He, alongside his brother Upendra Trivedi, has been prolific in Gujarati cinema. He is also famous for portraying Ravan in Ramanand Sagar's television series Ramayan. Both the brothers belong to village Kukadiya near Idar town.
- Rao Sonag, the first Rao of Idar, who was from the Marwar Dynasty.

== Geography ==
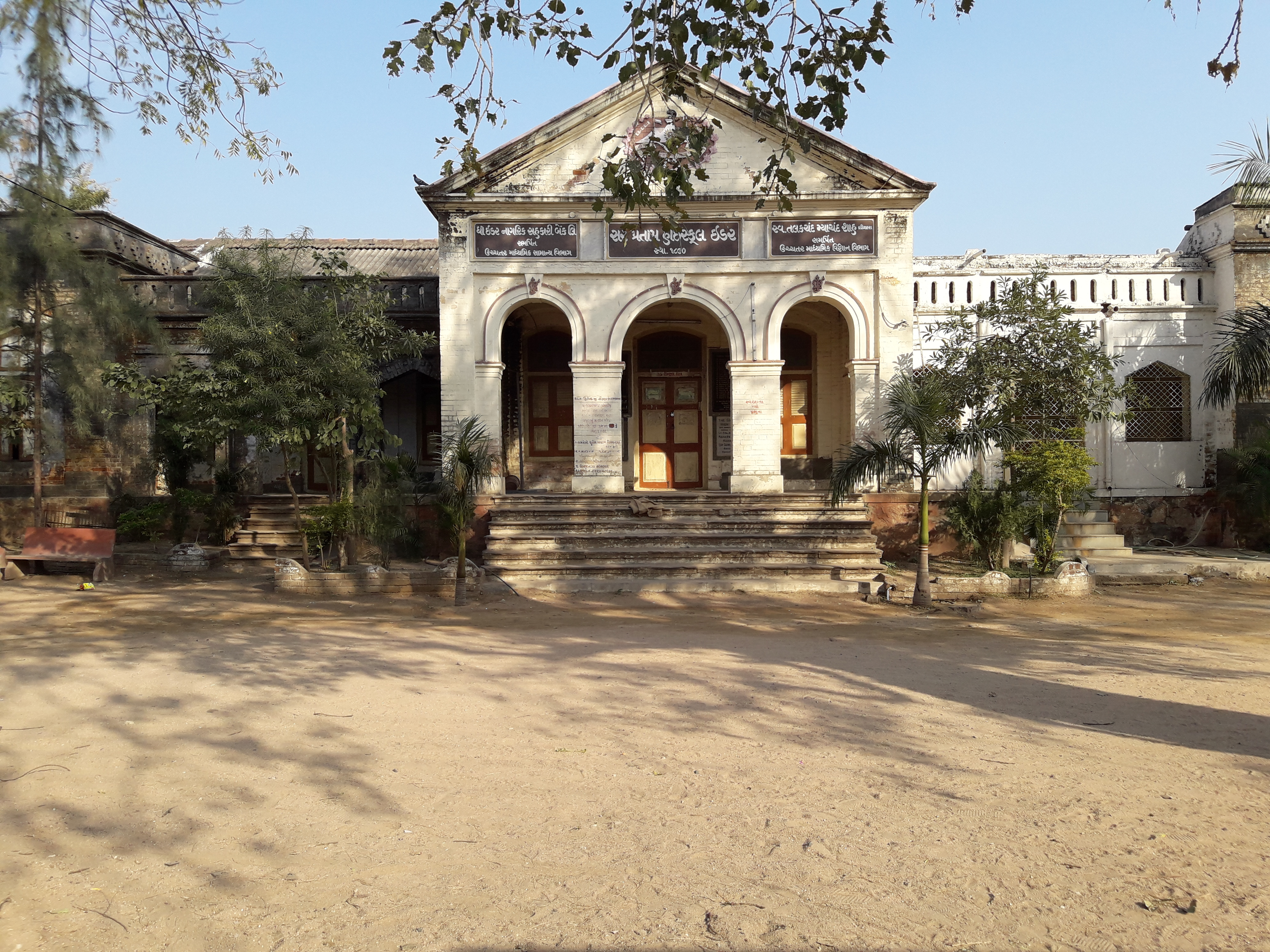
Sir Pratap High School

Idar is located at 23.83°N 73.0°E. It has an average elevation of 195 metres (639 feet). Idar is home to scenic mountains with round shaped grey or red granite rocks.

=== Climate ===
Idar has a tropical savanna climate (Köppen Aw) with a very long dry season and a moderate wet season. Daytime temperatures are high throughout the year, but nighttime temperatures can dip below 10 °C (50 °F) in the dry season.

Highest recorded temperature:48.5 °C (119.3 °F) on 22 May 2010
Lowest recorded temperature:4.8 °C (40.6 °F) on 22 January 1962

Climate data for Idar (1991–2020, extremes 1957–2020)
Month	Jan	Feb	Mar	Apr	May	Jun	Jul	Aug	Sep	Oct	Nov	Dec	Year
Record high °C (°F)	35.5 (95.9)	39.5 (103.1)	44.5 (112.1)	46.8 (116.2)	48.5 (119.3)	47.2 (117.0)	41.4 (106.5)	38.8 (101.8)	41.5 (106.7)	41.1 (106.0)	39.1 (102.4)	37.0 (98.6)	48.5 (119.3)
Mean daily maximum °C (°F)	28.7 (83.7)	31.2 (88.2)	36.5 (97.7)	39.9 (103.8)	41.3 (106.3)	38.7 (101.7)	33.1 (91.6)	31.6 (88.9)	33.4 (92.1)	36.3 (97.3)	33.6 (92.5)	30.4 (86.7)	34.6 (94.3)
Mean daily minimum °C (°F)	13.8 (56.8)	16.1 (61.0)	20.7 (69.3)	24.3 (75.7)	26.4 (79.5)	26.7 (80.1)	25.5 (77.9)	24.7 (76.5)	24.4 (75.9)	23.2 (73.8)	19.7 (67.5)	15.2 (59.4)	21.7 (71.1)
Record low °C (°F)	4.8 (40.6)	5.1 (41.2)	9.0 (48.2)	13.0 (55.4)	15.0 (59.0)	15.0 (59.0)	16.0 (60.8)	18.0 (64.4)	17.0 (62.6)	11.0 (51.8)	10.0 (50.0)	7.7 (45.9)	4.8 (40.6)
Average rainfall mm (inches)	0.6 (0.02)	0.7 (0.03)	0.5 (0.02)	1.8 (0.07)	3.5 (0.14)	69.9 (2.75)	291.1 (11.46)	259.3 (10.21)	147.5 (5.81)	16.1 (0.63)	0.2 (0.01)	0.6 (0.02)	791.9 (31.18)
Average rainy days	0.1	0.0	0.0	0.1	0.2	3.2	10.3	10.6	5.8	0.8	0.1	0.1	31.3
Average relative humidity (%) (at 17:30 IST)	32	30	21	21	24	42	65	71	59	37	34	35	38
Source: India Meteorological Department

== Economy ==
Idar is a region which has become a center for cotton ginning and processing. It also has a strong network of dairy co-operatives which helps it stay firm on an economic footing in years where there is drought.

== Demographics ==
As of 2001 India census, Idar had a population of 29,567. Males constitute 52% of the population and females 48%. Idar has an average literacy rate of 68%, higher than the national average of 59.5%: male literacy is 75%, and female literacy is 61%. 13% of Idar's population is under 6 years of age.

Jain, Brahmins, Patel, Mansuri, Darbar, Suthar (Mistry), Vaishnav Vaniya, Desai, Darji, Soni (goldsmiths), Vankars, and Thuri community live here.

== Places of interest ==
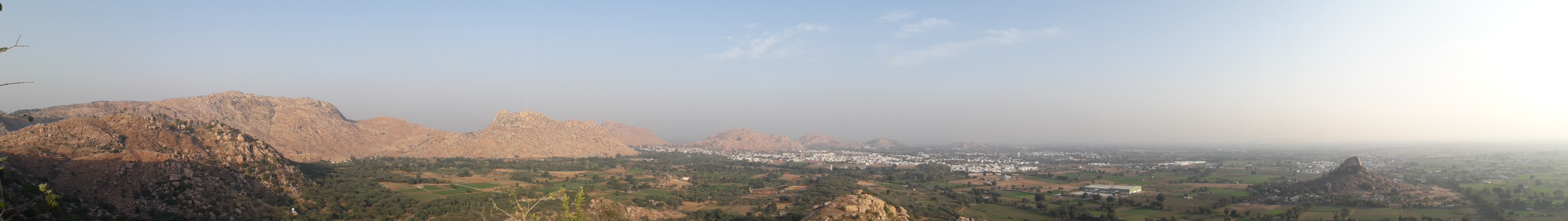
360° panorama of Idar hills
- Ramaleshvar lake, said to have been built by Rao Ranmal, with its western bank covered with picturesque domed cupolas, chhatris, raised over the ashes of the forefathers of the leading Idar families.
- Shantinath Shwetambar Jain Dersar: It is placed on Idar Gadh almost 450 steps. Very ancient and historical temple with full of architectural marvell. Revered place for Jain Community. Chief idol of Shantinath is believed to be old of the Maurya Era.
- Fort: The town was surrounded by a brick wall in the past which had three gateways named Mira Darwaja, Dhuleta Darwaja, marked with many red hands each recording a victim to the rite of sati. Inside of the wall, a road, running round the town, leads to the Gantino Darwajo, a rock-cut passage giving access to the main route to Rajasthan in past. Only a portion of the fortification is present now.

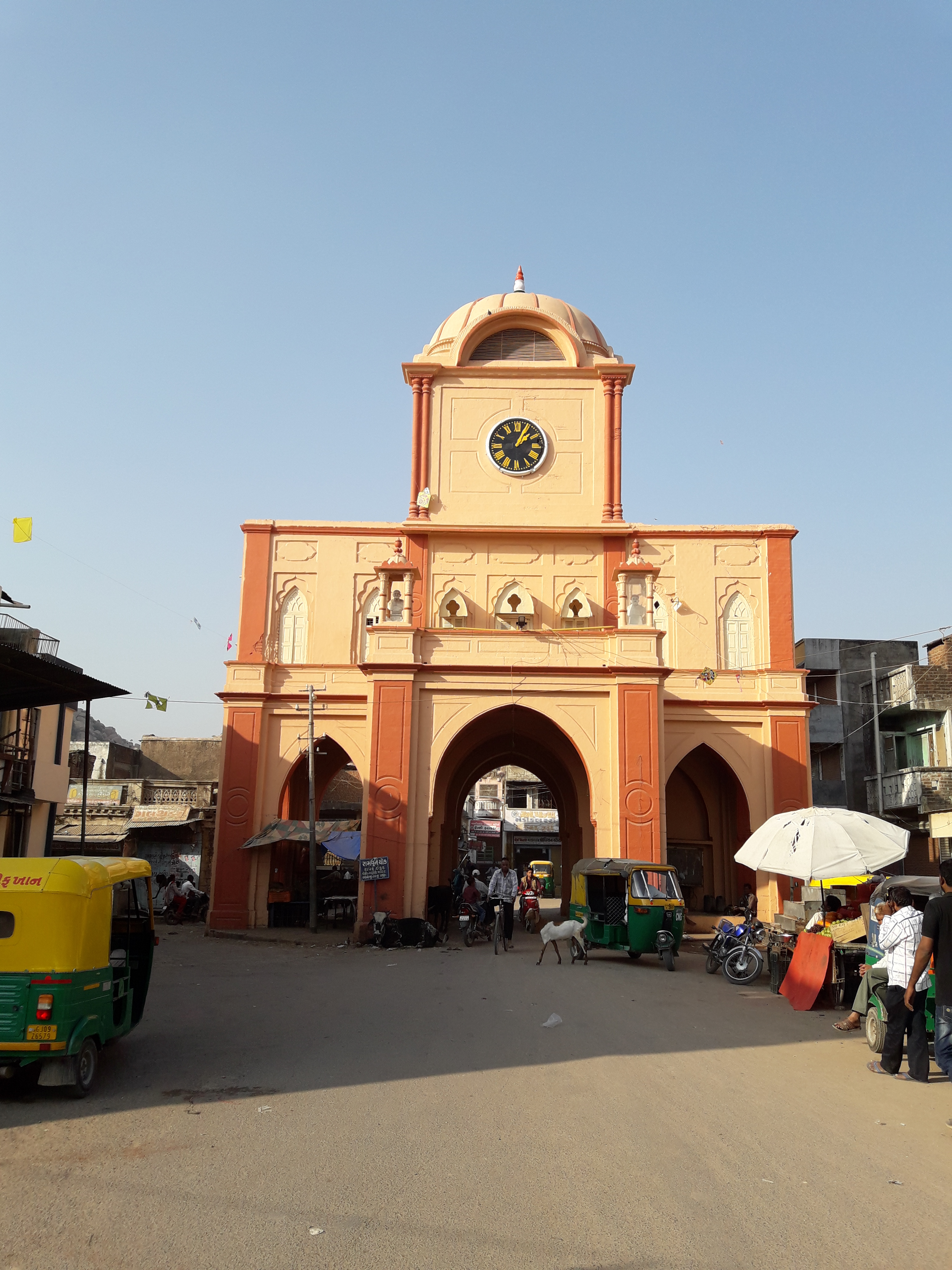
Idar clock tower

- Clock Tower, the starting of old town
- Chaturbhuj Stepwell, an ancient stone stepwell
- Idargadh palaces: At the end of the town and immediately under the hill is the palace, a large building with no architectural pretensions. The palace is said to have been built by Maharaja Dowlatsinhji in early twentieth century. Behind the palace, on the south-western face of the range of hills, which joins the Vindhya and Aravalli Range, rises Idargadh, so steep, rocky, and well fortified, that according to the local saying, to take Idargadh is to achieve the impossible. So, a famous folk song was mostly sung in traditional marriages, Áme Êderio Gadh Ĵitya Re Aanand Bhayo (We are very happy that we have conquered Idar Fort). From the palace a steep and easily held pathway leads through more than one gateway and fortified work to the fortress plateau, a table land raised well above the plain surrounded by heights, and with the gaps in the crest filled in and strengthened by ramparts. From below, two buildings, on opposite peaks, attract attention. The other building, on an enormous granite peak to the right, domed and of fine stone, lately smothered with whitewash, is known as the Roothi Rani no Mahel or Angry Queen's Palace.
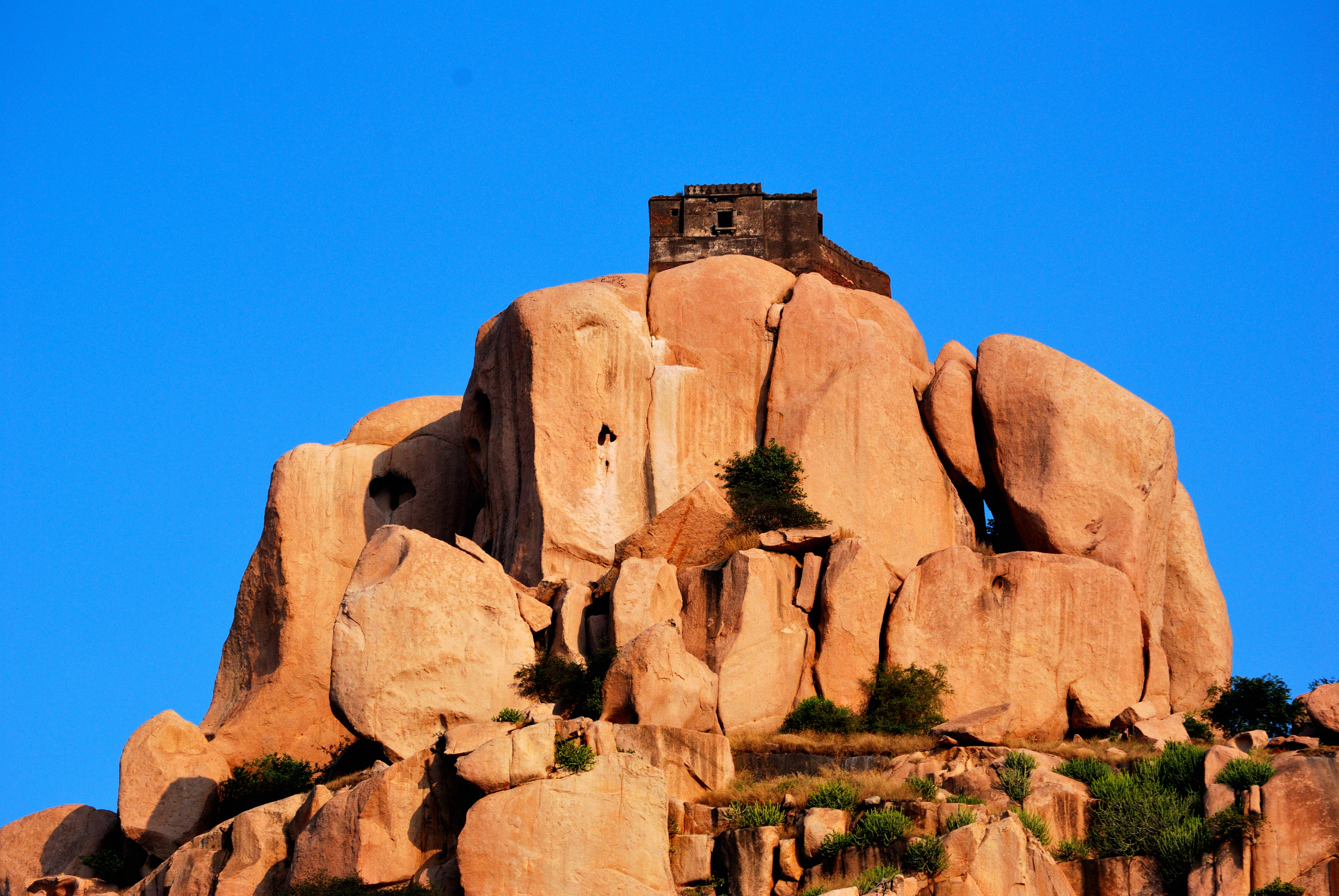
  Idargadh Roothi Rani no Mahel
  It measures twenty-five feet long by nineteen broad and twelve high. The story is that when Rao Narayanji or Narandas (1573) driven from Idar by Akbar, took refuge in Polo forests, in spite of a terrible ulcer on his back, he continued to harass the Musalmans. One day, when his back was being dressed, his Rani came into the room, and, seeing the fearful sore, mournfully shook her head. Noticing this in a mirror, the Rao asked why she shook her head. She said 'from what I see I have no hope that you will regain your lost throne.' This so annoyed her husband that he left the house, and, afterward, when he retook Idar, he refused to see the Rani's face. Disgusted at this treatment, and unwilling to live in her husband's palace, the Rani had a dwelling built on the highest peak of the hill and there passed the rest of her life. Some centuries after, this palace was the scene of a cruel assassination. Surajmal, Thakor of Chandni who had saved Idar from the Marathas, was so puffed up by his success that he gave great offence, especially to Bhavanisingh the son and heir- apparent of the old Maharaja Shivsingh. Bent on revenge the prince invited Surajmal to a feast, and, under pretence of inspecting the fort, took him up to the Angry Queen's Palace and there killed him. The way into the fort is by a stone paved pathway, the stone slippery and polished from the wear of ages. Passing under more or less ruined gateways the pathway leads to a part of the hill between, and much lower than, the two peaks.
- Following the path, on the right hand is a house built by the late Maharaja after a Mount Abu pattern. There are some ruins said to be remains of the Raos' old palace. Further on is a well-preserved freestone.
- The Queen's palace is rather difficult to reach, as, besides climbing to the top of the peak, a high smooth narrow granite ridge, unsafe for booted feet, has to bo crossed.
- Sheela Udyan, a rock garden
- Harishchandra Ki Chouri, where Raja Harishchandra got married
- Kharadi Bazaar, the market of toys

== Main temples ==
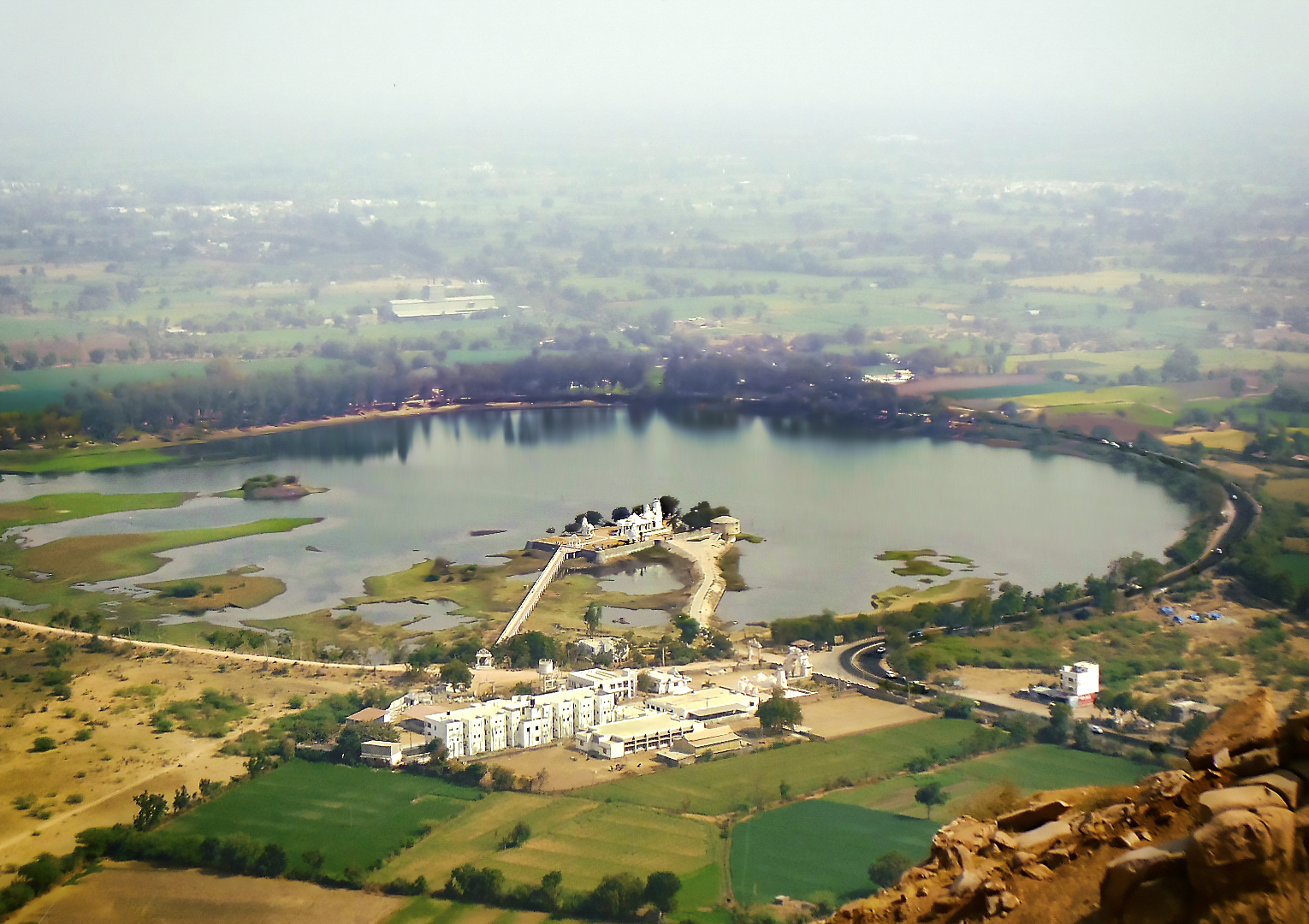
Rani Talav with Jain temple in the centre

- Shantinath Shwetambar Temple:This temple belongs to the Śvetāmbara Jain sect and dedicated to Shantinath, the sixteenth Tirthankara. This temple, measuring 160 feet by 125 and 55 high.Chief Idol of Lord Shantinath is evidently of considerable age of Maurya Era- King Samprati, 2300 years old. Kumarpal maharaja renovated it with the preaching of Kalikalsarvagya Hemchandracharya in the 11th century. In the 15th-16th century, temple again renovated. Its last and grand Jirnodhhar/Renovation was done by Samast Shwetambar Murtipujak Jain Sangh in the 1970 Vikram Samvat by the blessings of Kamalsuriji and Labdhisuriji. Shankheshwar tirth pedhi has given considerable amount. This is revered place for jains. Temple have marvellous structure and architecture. Temple is form in 52 jinalayas
- Sambhavanath Temple : Sambhavanath Temple is a Digambara Jain sect and dedicated to Sambhavanath, the third Tirthankara. This seems of even greater age than the other, but, like it, bears no date.
- Within the limits of the fort, with a wall and terraces in front, is a natural cavern twenty-eight feet by eighteen and seven high, containing an image of Vajra Mata a goddess worshipped by Hindus of all castes. The whole of the hill is surrounded with more or less ruined fortifications. To the rear are the remains of a fortified gateway, opening on the plain behind, a way of escape for the too hard-pressed defenders of the fort. It was through this gateway that Maharaja Anandsingji fled in 1733 and was attacked and slain by a party of Rehvar horse. The interior of the hill-fort, or rather fortified hill, is very striking from the dense brushwood by which the ruins are more or less hid. Perhaps the finest view is near Shambhavnath's temple, whence, looking towards the Angry Queen's Palace, the sheer scarp of the great granite peak, towering above the trees, stands clear against the sky.
- Rani Talav, a lake, half a mile to the north-east of Idar, has an area of ninety-four acres and a greatest depth of seventeen feet. Its supply lasts throughout the year but is used for irrigation. The east side of the lake is banked with masonry steps. It is said, but this is doubtful, to have been dug and built about 380 years ago by the wife of Rao Bhau, chief of Idar. The Pavapuri Jain temple of Swetambar sect built recently in the centre of the lake which can be reached by a bridge. The main temple is around 72 feet high, 72 feet long and is built on 72 pillars. The height of central idol of Mahavira is 72 cm which is surrounded by 72 carved figurines.

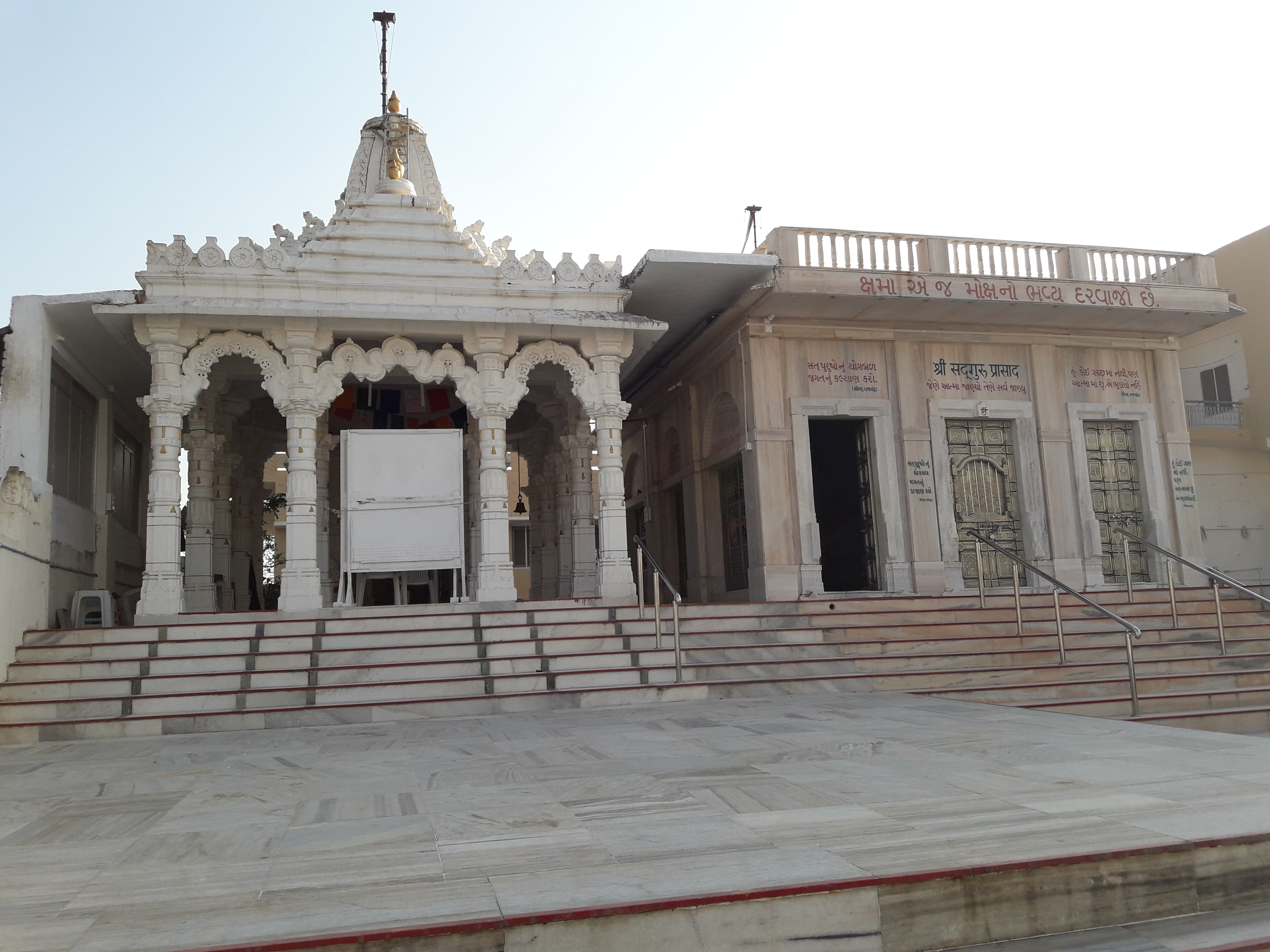
Shrimad Rajchandra Vihar

- Shrimad Rajchandra Vihar, a Jain temple complex on eastern hillock dedicated to Shrimad Rajchandra.
- Swaminarayan temple: raised at a cost of about £5000 (Rs. 50,000) around the 1870s.
- Cave temple of Khokhanath Mahadev, thirty feet long by twenty broad and from four to sis high, supposed to bo upwards of 400 years old. On a rising ground, south of the town and close to the wall, is the cave temple of Dhaneshvar Mahadev, a natural rock cavern twenty feet long by ten broad and from five to seven high. Three-quarters of a mile south-west of the town, on a rising ground, is the cave of Mankaleshvar Mahadev, twenty feet long by twelve broad and from five to ten high.
- Haveli: A temple belonging to the Vallabhacharya sect, completed around 1878 at a cost of about £2000 (Rs. 20,000).
- Ranmal's Choki or guardroom, seems to be an unfinished Jain temple, the building of which was stopped after the flat stone ceiling had been put on.

== See also ==
- Kadiadara
- Kava, Idar
- Sherpur, Sabarkantha
