= Sherpur Government Victoria Academy =

Secondary school in Bangladesh

Coordinates: 25.0213°N 90.0179°E

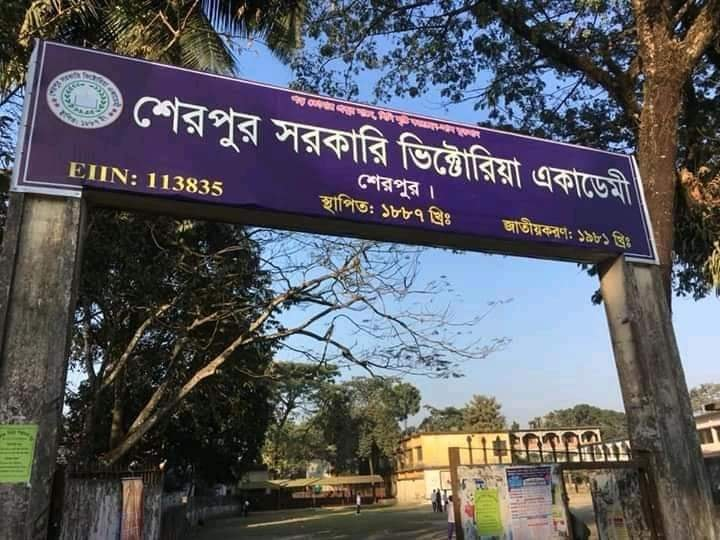
- Sherpur Government Victoria Academy
- Bangladesh 2100

Information
- Other name: Victoria Academy
- School type: Government Public schools
- Founded: 1887
- Founder: Zamindar Roy Bahadur Charu Chandra Chowdhury
- School board: Mymensingh
- School district: Sherpur District

Sherpur Government Victoria Academy is a boys' secondary school in Sherpur Sadar Upazila, Sherpur District, Bangladesh, founded in 1887.

== History ==
The school was founded on 1 April 1887 in honor of the 25th anniversary of the coronation of Queen Victoria. At the time it was called Sherpur Victoria Memorial Academy.

Until 1960 (after the partition of India in 1947), the school was run under the authority of the University of Calcutta. In 1981 it was nationalised and renamed Sherpur Government Victoria Academy.

The School has already passed its 125-year anniversary. On 30–31 January 2013 the "125 Year Anniversary" was celebrated by the former and current students. Advocate Abdul Hamid (Speaker of parliament) was present.
