= Joanna Hoffman =

American computer developer, Apple, NeXT

- Born: Joanna Karine Hoffman; July 27, 1955 (age 71); Poland
- Education: MIT; University of Chicago
- Known for: Member of both the original Macintosh team and NeXT team
- Spouse: Alain Rossmann
- Children: 2
- Parent(s): Jerzy Hoffman; Marlena Nazarian

Joanna Karine Hoffman (pronounced [jɔˈan.na ˈxɔf.man]; born July 27, 1955) is a Polish-American marketing executive. She was one of the original members of both the Apple Macintosh team and the NeXT team, and close friend of Steve Jobs.

At the time she began at Apple Computer, the Mac was "still a research project". Her position "constituted the entire Macintosh marketing team for the first year and a half of the project", which included Product Marketing collaboration on the Mac product design itself. She also wrote the "first draft of the Macintosh User Interface Guidelines". Hoffman would eventually run the International Marketing Team which brought the Mac to Europe and Asia.

== Early life ==
Hoffman was born in Poland, the daughter of Polish-Jewish film director Jerzy Hoffman and his Armenian former wife Marlena Nazarian. She lived with her mother in the Armenian SSR until age 10, when she went to live with her father in Warsaw, Poland. In 1967, her mother married an American and moved to Buffalo, New York. Hoffman joined them in the United States in 1968. Hoffman quickly became fluent in English and excelled in school.

She has a background in anthropology, physics, and linguistics, a Bachelor of Science in Humanities and Science from Massachusetts Institute of Technology (MIT), and pursued a doctorate (which she did not complete) in archaeology at the University of Chicago at the Oriental Institute. In 1979, she was scheduled to travel to Iran for an archaeology dig. She stopped in Poland to visit her grandmother and received word from Iran that she would have to return to the United States because of the Iranian Revolution.

== Career ==
Hoffman was on a leave of absence from the University of Chicago when she was encouraged by her friends to attend a lecture at Xerox PARC in California. While there, she had "a heated discussion after the lecture" with Jef Raskin. The discussion focused on "what computers should look like and how they should improve people's lives." Raskin was so impressed with Hoffman that he asked her to interview for a position at Apple. She began on the Macintosh project in October 1980 as part of Raskin's initial team of Burrell Smith, Bud Tribble, and Brian Howard.

Hoffman had a reputation at both Apple and NeXT as one of the few who could successfully engage with Steve Jobs. In both 1981 and 1982, she won a satirical award at Apple given to "the person who did the best job of standing up to Jobs". (Jobs was aware of and liked the award.) Eventually she rose to become Head of Manufacturing. She resigned after Jobs decided to take the inventory of unsold Lisas, graft on a Macintosh-emulation program, and sell them as a new product, the "Macintosh XL". Said Hoffman, "I was furious because the Mac XL wasn't real. It was just to blow the excess Lisas out the door. It sold well, and then we had to discontinue the horrible hoax, so I resigned".

During the early 1990s, Hoffman was vice president of Marketing at General Magic, retiring in 1995 to spend more time with her family. On occasion she has given public lectures discussing her early life at Apple and working with Steve Jobs.

In 2020 she was hired by the Spanish artificial intelligence company Sherpa as a consultant and the right-hand of its founder and CEO Xabi Uribe Etxebarria.

Hoffman has a very negative opinion of Facebook. In an interview she said Facebook is "destroying the very fabric of democracy, destroying the very fabric of human relationships, and peddling in an addictive drug called anger."

== Personal life ==
Hoffman is married to Alain Rossmann, a native of France, who also worked on the Mac team at Apple. They have two sons.

== Portrayal in media ==
Abigail McConnell portrayed Hoffman in the 2013 film Jobs. English actress Kate Winslet portrayed Hoffman in the 2015 film Steve Jobs. Winslet won the Golden Globe Award and BAFTA Award for Best Actress in a Supporting Role, and was nominated for the Academy Award and Screen Actors Guild Award in the same category for her performance.

On the nature of the relationship between Hoffman and Jobs, Winslet described her as Jobs' "work wife", and that "she was an extraordinary, feisty Eastern European person who was pretty much the only person who could actually knock sense into Steve".
