= Kava, Idar =

Kava is a village in Idar, India. The population in this village is close to 2500. Shrimati J. P Patel High School is the main high school. This village is surrounded by Arvalli Girimala. As per constitution of India and Panchayati Raaj Act, Kava village is administrated by Sarpanch (Head of Village), who is the elected representative of village. Currently, Sarpanch of Kava is Amitbhai Patel.

The Kava village has a population of 2,374 of which 1,195 are males while 1,179 are females as per Population Census 2011. Population of children with age 0-6 is 327, which makes up 13.77% of total population of village. Average Sex Ratio of Kava village is 987, which is higher than Gujarat state average of 919. But the child Sex Ratio for the Kava as per census is 869, which is lower than the Gujarat average of 890.

Kava village has lower literacy rate compared to Gujarat state average. In 2011, literacy rate of Kava village was 75.48% compared to 78.03% of Gujarat. Male literacy stands at 86.47% while female literacy rate was 64.56%.

Scheduled Caste (SC) constitutes 19.21% of the total population, while Scheduled Tribes (ST) took up 1.14%.

In terms of employment, 852 people were engaged in work activities. 91.20% of workers describe their work as Main Work (Employment or Earning more than 6 Months) while 8.80% were involved in Marginal Work, providing livelihood for less than 6 months. Of 777 workers engaged in Main Work, 205 were cultivators (owner or co-owner) while 376 were agricultural labourers.

Census Data (2011)
Particulars	Total	Male	Female
Total No. of Houses	505	-	-
Population	2,374	1,195	1,179
Child (0-6)	327	175	152
Scheduled Caste	456	223	233
Scheduled Tribe	27	13	14
Literacy	75.48%	86.47%	64.56%
Total Workers	852	693	159
Main Worker	777	-	-
Marginal Worker	75	-	-
