= Sherpa (delivery service) =

Australian courier service provider

- Type: Private Limited
- Founders: Ben Nowlan, Bastien Vetault, Mathieu Cornillon
- Headquarters: Sydney, Australia
- Services: Courier Service

Sherpa is an Australian technology company that aims to provide on-demand and same-day delivery services to businesses and individuals. The Sherpa Delivery app functions similarly to ridesharing apps like Uber and Lyft by connecting users to a network of crowdsourced courier drivers who operate as independent contractors. Sherpa's delivery services include 1-hour, 2-hour, 4-hour and same-day delivery.

== Operations ==
Sherpa was founded in Sydney, Australia, in 2014 by Mathieu Cornillon, Ben Nowland & Bastien Vetault. Sherpa currently operates in multiple Australian cities, including Sydney, Melbourne, Brisbane, Adelaide, Perth, Hobart, Launceston, Geelong, Newcastle, Gosford, Gold Coast, Sunshine Coast, Albury, Cairns, Canberra, Gladstone, McKay and Wollongong. Sherpa has also expanded to the New Zealand market, operating in Christchurch and Auckland.

- Users: An end user (individuals) of Sherpa logs deliveries via a mobile app on iPhone and Android or via the web platform. Users can arrange a simple pick-up and delivery or a purchase and delivery. The latter means a user can send a Sherpa to the shop to purchase items on their behalf.
