= Sherpur dogran =

- Village
- Location in Punjab, India Sherpur dogran (India)
- Coordinates: 31.279498°N 75.120970°E
- Country: India
- State: Punjab
- District: Kapurthala

Government
  - Type: Panchayati raj (India)
  - Body: Gram panchayat

Languages
  - Official: Punjabi
  - Other spoken: Hindi
- Time zone: UTC+5:30 (IST)
- PIN: 144628
- Telephone code: 01822
- ISO 3166 code: IN-PB
- Vehicle registration: PB-09
- Website: kapurthala.gov.in

Sherpur dogran is a village in Sultanpur Lodhi tehsil in Kapurthala district of Punjab, India. It is located 16 kilometres (9.9 mi) from the city of Sultanpur Lodhi, 41 kilometres (25 mi) away from district headquarter Kapurthala. The village is administrated by a Sarpanch who is an elected representative of village as per the constitution of India and Panchayati raj (India).

== List of cities near the village ==
- Bhulath
- Kapurthala
- Phagwara
- Sultanpur Lodhi

== Air travel connectivity ==
The closest International airport to the village is Sri Guru Ram Dass Jee International Airport.
