= Sherpur, Maner =

Village in Bihar, India

Sherpur
- Village
- Location within Bihar Location within India
- Coordinates: 25°39′07″N 84°58′20″E
- Country: India
- State: Bihar
- District: Patna
- Block: Maner

Government
  - Type: Sarpanch

Area
  - Total: 5.85 km^{2} (2.26 sq mi)
- Elevation: 57 m (187 ft)

Population (2011)
  - Total: 31,073
  - Density: 5,310/km^{2} (13,800/sq mi)

Languages
  - Spoken: Magadhi, Hindi
- Time zone: UTC+5:30 (IST)
- PIN: 801503
- STD code: 06115
- Vehicle registration: BR-01

Sherpur is a village in Maner block of Patna district, Bihar, India. It is located in the northern portion of Patna district, about 22 kilometres northwest of the district seat Patna. Its population was 31,073 in the 2011 census.

== Geography ==
Sherpur lies on the southern shore of Ganges River, with Chhitnawan-Maner Road passing through its north. It has a total area of 585 hectares.

== Demographics ==
As per the 2011 India census, Sherpur had a total population of 31,073, of which 16,335 were male and 14,738 were female. The literacy rate was 43.64%, with 8,121 of the male residents and 5,439 of the female residents being literate.
