= Sherpur Sadar Upazila =

Sherpur Sadar শেরপুর সদর
- Upazila
- Sherpur Sadar
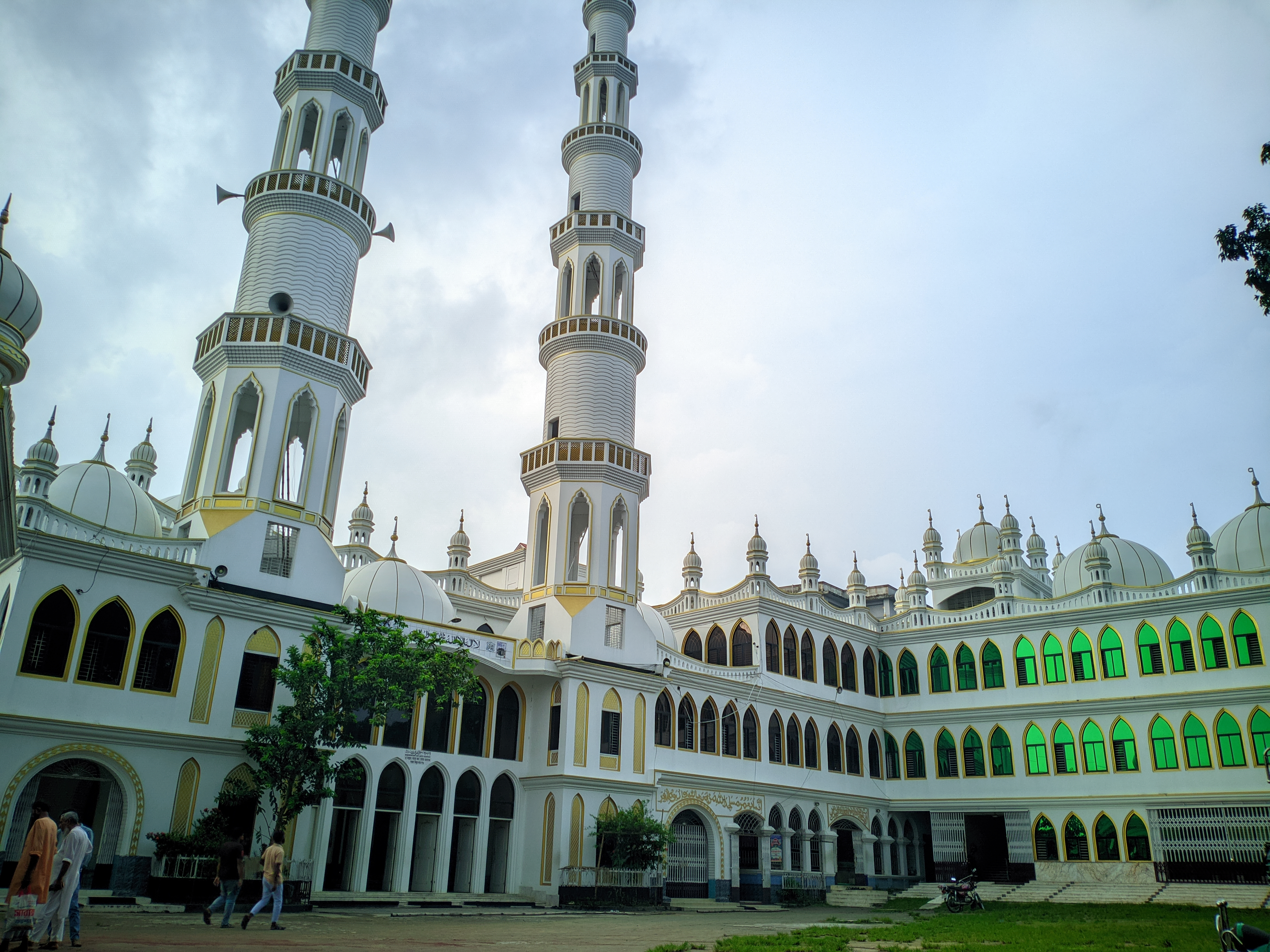
- Mai Saheba Jame Masjid

- Coordinates: 25°0′N 90°1′E
- Country: Bangladesh
- Division: Mymensingh Division
- District: Sherpur District
- Headquarters: Sherpur

Government
  - Mayor: Golam Kibriya Liton
  - UNO: Firoz Al Mamun
  - MP: Rashedul Islam (politician) (Jamaat-e-Islami)
  - Legislature: 13th National Parliament (Since Feb 2026)

Area
  - Total: 372.89 km^{2} (143.97 sq mi)

Population (2022)
  - Total: 563,865
  - Density: 1,512.1/km^{2} (3,916.4/sq mi)
- Time zone: UTC+6 (BST)
- Postal code: 2100
- Area code: 0931
- Website: Official Website

Sherpur Sadar Upazila mauza geocode map

Sherpur Sadar (Bengali: শেরপুর সদর) is an upazila of Sherpur District in the Division of Mymensingh, Bangladesh.

== Demographics ==
Historical population
| Year | Pop. | ±% |
|---|---|---|
| 1981 | 302,492 | — |
| 1991 | 381,419 | +26.1% |
| 2001 | 449,798 | +17.9% |
| 2011 | 497,179 | +10.5% |
| 2022 | 563,865 | +13.4% |
Source: Bangladesh Bureau of Statistics

Religions in Sherpur Sadar Upazila (2022)
| Religion | Percent |
| Islam | 98.43% |
| Hinduism | 1.46% |
| Other or not stated | 0.11% |

According to the 2022 Bangladeshi census, Sherpur Sadar Upazila had 145,848 households and a population of 563,865. 9.97% of the population were under 5 years of age. Sherpur Sadar had a literacy rate (age 7 and over) of 63.89%: 65.99% for males and 61.87% for females, and a sex ratio of 97.79 males for 100 females. 191,251 (33.92%) lived in urban areas.

== Administration ==
Sherpur Sadar Thana was turned into an upazila in 1984.

Sherpur Sadar Upazila is divided into Sherpur Municipality and 14 union parishads: Bajitkhila, Balairchar, Betmari Ghughurakandi, Chormochoriya, Chorpokhimari, Chorsherpur, Dhola, Gajirkhamar, Kamarar Chor, Kamariya, Losmonpur, Pakuriya, Rouha, and Vatshala. The union parishads are subdivided into 100 mauzas and 188 villages.

Sherpur Municipality is subdivided into 9 wards and 46 mahallas.

== Education ==
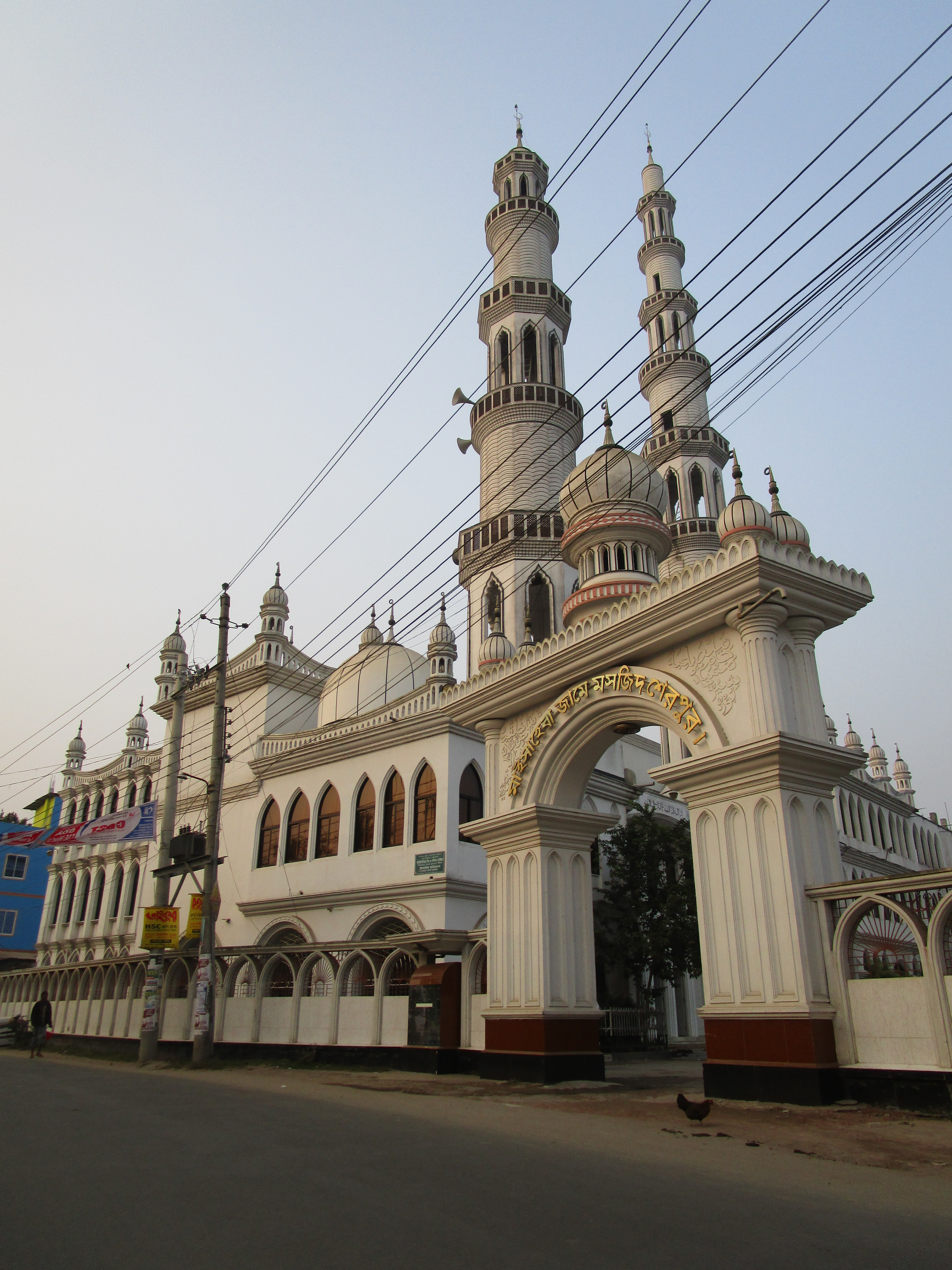
Mysaheba Jame Masque, Sherpur

There are 11 colleges in the upazila: Sherpur Government College, Sherpur Government Mohila College, Beer Muktijodda Atiur Rahman Model College, Dr. Sekander Ali College, Jamsad Ali Memorial College, Kamarar Char College, Model Girls College, Sherpur, Nizam Uddin Ahmed Model College, Sanuwer Hosen Model College, Shahid Abdur Rashid Commerce College and Sherpur Biggan College. Other schools include Ideal Preparatory and High School (1991), Govt victoria academy, Govt girls high school, and Nobarun public school.

According to Banglapedia, Sherpur Government Victoria Academy (1887), GK Pilot High School, founded in 1919, Sapmari High School (1907), and Sherpur High School (1920) are notable secondary schools. Sherpur is the birthplace of numerous highly educated doctors and engineers, also people of different occupations.

== See also ==
- Upazilas of Bangladesh
- Districts of Bangladesh
- Divisions of Bangladesh
- Upazila
- Thana
