= Chris Shipley =

American writer

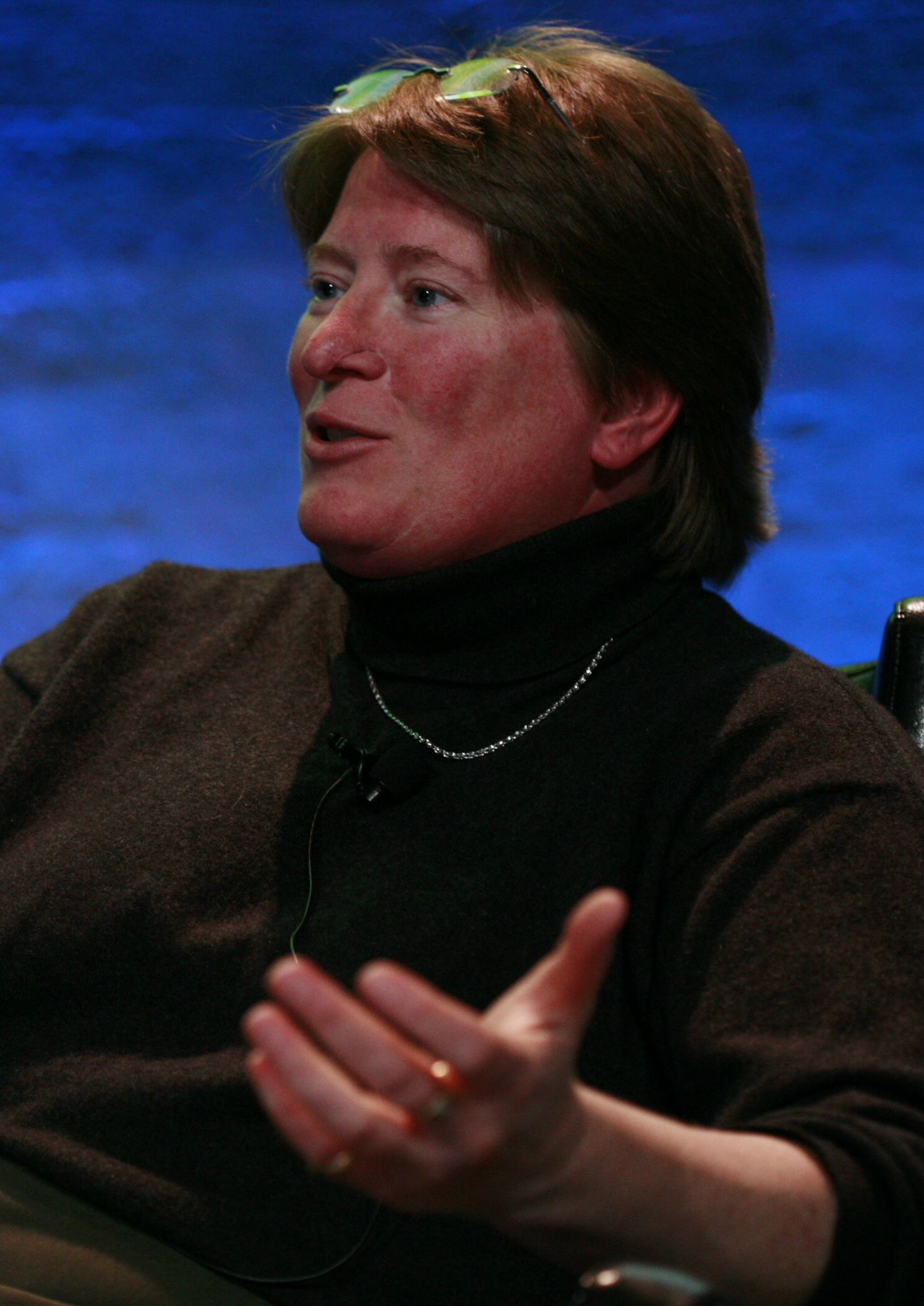
- Born: January 11, 1962 (age 64); Pittsburgh, Pennsylvania, U.S.
- Education: Allegheny College, B.A.
- Occupations: Technology writer and analyst

Chris Shipley (born January 11, 1962) is an American tech author and analyst.

== Biography ==
Shipley began her career as a technology writer, and later became executive editor at PC/Computing magazine, then joined the company's online publishing division, ZDNet, where she introduced online publications on CompuServe, Prodigy, and Ziff-Davis's Interchange Online Network. In 1994, Shipley became the founding editor of Computer Life magazine, based in San Francisco.

In 1996, Shipley joined International Data Group (IDG) as the executive producer of the DEMO Conference, a conference of industry insiders, investors, early adopters, and journalists working in the data and tech sectors.

She is the author of several books, including How to Connect (Ziff-Davis Press) and How the World Wide Web Works (Ziff-Davis Press). In 2020, Shipley co-authored The Adaptation Advantage (Wiley), a book about the future of work, with Heather Elizabeth McGowan. The book was selected as one of the top 30 business books of 2021 by Soundview

Shipley has served on the boards of several start-up companies, including Versaic, which was acquired by Benevity in 2018. She was also the founder and CEO of Guidewire Group, a technology services firm and startup incubator based in the San Francisco Bay Area, and a mentor for Unreasonable Group, a business accelerator for social entrepreneurs.

== Awards ==
In 2002, Fortune Small Business Magazine cited Shipley as a "most perfect board member". In 2004 the San Jose Business Journal placed her at the top of its list of Most Influential Women in Silicon Valley. In 2010, SVForum honored Shipley with its Visionary Award.
