= Sherpur, Sabarkantha =

Sherpur
- village
- Location in Gujarat, India Sherpur (India)
- Coordinates: 23.47°N 73.2°E
- Country: India
- State: Gujarat
- District: Sabarkantha
- Talukas: Idar

Languages
  - Official: Gujarati, Hindi
- Time zone: UTC+5:30 (IST)
- PIN: 383410
- Telephone code: 2778
- Vehicle registration: GJ-9
- Website: gujaratindia.com

Sherpur is a village located about 6 kilometres (4 mi) south of Idar and 27 kilometres (17 mi) north of Himatnagar in Sabarkantha district in the Indian state of Gujarat.
