= List of Cantonese people =

This is an incomplete list of notable people that are regarded as being of Cantonese origin:

== Historical ==
- Liu Yan, king of Nanhai and first emperor of the Yue/Han kingdom between 917–971
- Yuan Chonghuan, Ming dynasty general and patriot famed for defeating Qing dynasty rulers and founder Nurchaci and Hong Taiji
- Liang Daoming, king of Palembang during the Ming dynasty.
- Ching Shih, worlds successful pirate and one of the world's most powerful pirates; she challenged the British empire, Portuguese empire, and Qing dynasty and was undefeated.[34][35]
- Cheng I, pirate and husband of Ching Shih
- Ah Pak, pirate chieftain who defeated Portuguese pirates
- Liu Chang, the last emperor of the Southern Han Kingdom
- Luo Sen, interpreter that assisted translations for American Commodore Mathew Perry in opening up Japan
- Sun Yat-sen, born in Zhongshan, Guangdong. Chinese revolutionary and founder of the Republic of China. Sun's father was Cantonese, while mother a cantonese
- Deng Shichang, admiral and one of the first modern naval officers in China in the late Qing dynasty
- Tse Tsan-tai, early Chinese revolutionary of the late Qing Dynasty
- Kang Youwei was a Chinese scholar, noted calligrapher and prominent political thinker and reformer of the late Qing dynasty.
- Liang Qichao was a Chinese scholar, journalist, philosopher, and reformist who lived during the Qing dynasty and Republic of China.
- Sun Ke, born in Xiangshan (now Zhongshan), Guangdong. Premier of the Republic of China, 1932, 1948–1949
- Henry Lee Hau Shik, first Finance Minister of the Federation of Malaya and only Chinese signatory of the Malayan independence agreement with Britain.[36]
- Jiang Guangnai, general and statesman in the Republic of China and the People's Republic of China who successfully defended Shanghai City from the Japanese invasion in the 28 January Incident of 1932

== Actors and entertainers ==
- Anna May Wong, the first Chinese-American and Asian female international movie star
- Anita Mui, singer and actress, dubbed as the "Madonna of the East".
- James Wong Howe, leading Hollywood cinematographer in the 1930s–40s and ten-time Academy Award nominee
- Lai Man-Wai, the father of Hong Kong cinema
- Stephen Chow, His grandfather is from Ningbo but his mother is Cantonese. He is actor and film director known for the comedy blockbusters Shaolin Soccer and Kung Fu Hustle
- John Woo, influential film director
- Tony Leung Chiu-wai, award-winning actor known for his collaborations with Wong Kar-wai, including In the Mood for Love
- Andy Lau, one of Hong Kong's most commercially successful singers and actors since the mid-1980s
- Gigi Lai, actress and Cantopop singer
- Aaron Kwok, dancer and singer since the early 1990s
- Amy Kwok, actress and Miss Hong Kong 1991
- Eason Chan, well-known Cantopop singer
- Rainie Yang, Taiwanese singer
- Vivian Chow, Cantopop singer and actress
- Fish Leong, Malaysian-Chinese singer
- Kris Wu, Canadian rapper and former member of K-Pop boy band EXO.
- Jackson Wang, rapper and member of K-Pop boy band GOT7.
- Louis Koo, Hong Kong actor
- Tony Leung Ka Fai, Hong Kong actor
- Cheung Ka Fai, Hong Kong actor
- Leo Ku, Hong Kong singer
- Rui En, famous Singaporean actress
- Liang Wern Fook, one of the pioneer figures in Singaporean Chinese folk songs
- Yuen Woo-ping, renowned as one of the most successful and influential figures in the world of Hong Kong action cinema
- Sinn Sing Hoi, one of the earliest generation of Chinese composers
- Chris Cheong, an international mentalist and illusionist.
- Terence Cao, Singaporean actor
- Mark Chen, renowned Singaporean composer
- Kelly Poon, Singaporean singer
- Awkwafina, her mother is South Korean. American rapper, comedian, television personality, television host
- Jeff Chan, Asian American tenor saxophonist and composer
- Zen Chong, Malaysian actor and won supporting acting in 2009
- Michael Paul Chan is an American television and film actor.
- Laura Ling, American journalist and writer. Correspondent and vice president of its Vanguard Journalism Unit
- Lisa Ling, American journalist, television presenter, special correspondent for The Oprah Winfrey Show
- Sam Tsui, American singer/songwriter and video producer. Internet celebrity with 2.8 million subscribers on YouTube
- Wong brothers, three ethnic Chinese film directors, the pioneers of the Indonesian movie industry
- Lo Lieh, famous Hong Kong action star
- Lü Wencheng, master of Cantonese music and Guangdong folk music
- Lucas Wong, rapper and former member of K-Pop boy group NCT under SM Entertainment
- Warren Mok, an operatic tenor who has performed many leading roles since his European debut in 1987.
- Hung Sin-nui, Master of Chinese and Cantonese opera.
- Jeff Fatt, Australian musician and actor.

== Politicians ==
- Tang Shaoyi, Prime Minister of the Republic of China.
- Donald Tsang, Chief executive of Hong Kong
- Edmund Ho Hau Wah, Chief executive of Macau
- Fernando Chui, Chief executive of Macau
- Wu Tingfang, China's foreign minister during the Qing dynasty
- Wen Tsung-yao, politician and diplomat in the Qing dynasty and Republic of China
- Kang Tongbi (康同璧) was the daughter of Kang Youwei, a Chinese reformer and political figure of the late Qing dynasty and early Republican era.
- Hiram Fong, the first Asian-American and Chinese to be elected as Republican United States Senator and nominated for presidency of the United States
- John So, the first Lord Mayor of Melbourne to be directly elected by the people in 2006, and the first mayor of Asian descent
- Adrienne Clarkson, 26th Governor General of Canada, the first non-white Canadian to be appointed to the vice-regal position
- Norman Kwong, the 16th Lieutenant Governor of Alberta, Canada
- Gary Locke, first governor of a state in the Continental United States of Asian descent; the only Chinese American ever to serve as a governor
- Judy Chu, first Chinese-American woman to be elected to the United States Congress
- Julius Chan, Prime Minister of Papua New Guinea from 1980 to 1982, and from 1994 to 1997
- Lee Siew Choh, politician and medical doctor. Singapore's first Non-Constituency Member of Parliament (NCMP)
- Tan Sri Datuk Amar Stephen Kalong Ningkan was the first Chief Minister of Sarawak.
- Víctor Joy Way was the Prime Minister of Peru from January 1999 until December 1999.
- José Antonio Chang Escobedo was the Prime Minister of Peru and second Chinese–Peruvian Prime Minister, the first being Víctor Joy Way.
- Peter Chin, lawyer and 56th Dunedin, New Zealand mayor
- John Yap, Canadian politician
- Meng Foon, mayor of Gisborne, New Zealand
- Alan Lowe, architect, former mayor of Victoria, British Columbia, Canada
- Ida Chong, accountant, former municipal councilor of Saanich, British Columbia, former cabinet minister/Member of Legislative Assembly of British Columbia, Canada
- Yeoh Ghim Seng, Speaker of the Parliament of Singapore from 1970 to 1989
- Chang Apana, inspirational detective with an influential law enforcement career
- Kin W. Moy American diplomat and the first ethnic Chinese to be director of the American Institute in Taiwan,
- Carrie Lam Cheng Yuet-ngor, GBM, GBS (Chinese: 林鄭月娥; born 13 May 1957) is the Chief executive of Hong Kong.
- Debra Wong Yang, first Asian American woman to serve as a United States Attorney.
- Chan Heng Chee, Singapore's Minister in Prime Minister's Office, Chief of Army from 2010 to 2011
- Chan Sek Keong, third Chief Justice of Singapore, Attorney-General of Singapore from 1992 to 2006
- Chan Kong Choy, Malaysian politician, deputy president and transport minister.
- Cheryl Chan, member of the country's governing People's Action Party (PAP),
- Sitoh Yih Pin, Singapore politician member of Parliament (MP)
- Leong Yew Koh, first Governor of Malacca since independence.
- Cheong Yoke Choy, famous and well respected philanthropist during the British Malaya era.
- Edwin Tong, member of Parliament in Singapore representing the Marine Parade Group Representation Constituency.
- Eu Chooi Yip, prominent member of the anti-colonial and Communist movements in Malaya and Singapore
- Ho Peng Kee, Senior Minister of State in the Ministry of Law and the Ministry of Home Affairs
- Jek Yeun Thong, prominent first generation People's Action Party (PAP) politician in Singapore
- Hoo Ah Kay, leader with many high ranking posts in Singapore, honourable consul to Japan, Russia and China.
- Kan Ting Chiu, Senior Judge in the Supreme Court.
- Ho Yuen Hoe, Nun who received a Public Service Award from the President of Singapore
- Kin W. Moy, American diplomat. He is one of the first Chinese to hold an important position
- Datuk Patinggi Tan Sri Dr. George Chan Hong Nam (陈康南;), was the former Deputy Chief Minister of Sarawak.
- Fong Chan Onn, Malaysian politician and a former Minister of Human Resources
- Fong Po Kuan, Malaysian politician from the Democratic Action Party (DAP)
- Loke Siew Fook, Member of the Parliament of Malaysia
- Tan Chee Khoon, major figure in Malaysian politics from 1959 to 1978
- Lui Tuck Yew, country's Minister for Transport and Second Minister for Defence, Singapore's Chief of Navy from 1999 to 2003
- António Ng Kuok Cheong is currently a member in the Macau Legislative Assembly and was the founding chairman of the New Democratic Macau Association.

== Athletes ==
- Chen Aisen, Chinese diver. He is a double gold medal winner at the 2016 Summer Olympics and a world champion.
- Wong Peng Soon, A renowned male badminton player in the latter half of the 20th century
- Patrick Chan, A world champion Chinese-Canadian male figure skater
- Michelle Kwan, Chinese-American female figure skater and five-time world champion
- Yi Jianlian, a 7-foot-tall Chinese basketball player for NBA, Milwaukee Bucks, New Jersey Nets, and Washington Wizards
- Guan Weizhen, female badminton player who won three consecutive women's doubles titles at the BWF World Championships
- Chen Xiaomin Chinese retired weightlifter, in 2000 Sydney Olympics on the women's weightlifting gold medal, also a world and Asian champion
- Shanshan Feng, The first golfer from China to win LPGA major championship and major championship, she was ranked fifth in 2012 Women's World Golf Rankings.
- He Chong, Chinese, diver. He is the 2008 Olympic Champion gold medalist in the 3m springboard. He was unbeaten from 2006 to 2016
- Jiang Jialiang, Table Tennis player, he won medals in Asia and world table tennis tournaments.
- Xie Xingfang, Badminton player, she is a two-time world champion women's singles.
- Chen Xiexia, She won three golds at the 2007 World Weightlifting Championships. The first gold medal for China in the 2008 Summer Olympics.
- Zhang Jiewen, Gold medal in Badminton 2004 Athens
- Lao Lishi, Gold medal in women's 10-meter synchronized platform along with Li Ting.
- Su Bingtian, As a sprinter, he is the reigning Asian champion over 100 metres, was a semi-finalist at the 2012 Summer Olympics and a finalist at the 2015 World Championships.
- Liang Wen-Chong, Highest ranked golfer from the People's Republic of China, the only Chinese golfer to have reached the top 100 of the Official World Golf Ranking.
- Zeng Qiliang, the first medal of Chinese male swimmer in world championships.
- Lindswell Kwok, six times world champion of Wushi
- Brian Ah Yat, former American football quarterback
- Harland Ah You, is a former gridiron football defensive lineman who played 10 games with the Calgary Stampeders of the Canadian Football League in 1998.
- Junior Ah You, Hall of Fame and Top 50 players of the league's modern era by Canadian sports network TSN.
- Keanu Asing(urfer who competes in the World Surf League and debuted on the World Championship Tour of the 2015 World Surf League.<
- Josiah Ng, Josiah was the first Malaysian to make it into the cycling Olympic finals becoming a three-time Olympian

== Business ==
- Raymond, Thomas, and Walter Kwok, brothers whose property business makes them the fourth richest in Hong Kong
- Stanley Ho, Hong Kong and Macanese business magnate
- Lui Che-woo, real estate and hospitality magnate, Hong Kong billionaire, once the 2nd richest man in Asia
- Cheng Yu-tung, Hong Kong billionaire
- Tang Yiu Hong Kong billionaire businessman, founder of shoe and sportswear retailer Belle International
- Ma Mon-Luk, a Chinese immigrant to the Philippines from Zhongshan, Guangdong, best known for his eponymous restaurant, and for popularizing and alleged creator of mami (a noodle soup) and popularizer of siopao (a steamed bun based on the cha siu bao) in the country he immigrated
- Mei Quong Tart, rich nineteenth-century merchant
- Charles Sew Hoy, merchant and gold-dredging pioneer
- Loke Yew, philanthropist and was once the richest man in British Malaysia
- Chin Gee Hee, merchant and railway entrepreneur
- Lee Shau-kee, Once the 4th richest man in world, real estate tycoon and owner of Henderson Land Development
- Steven Lo, businessman and football team manager
- He Jingtang, a prominent Chinese architect for Olympic 2008
- Jimmy Lai, founder of Giordano
- Ho Ching, First Lady of Singapore
- He Xiangjian is the co-founder of Midea, one of China's largest appliance makers.
- Zhang Zhidong, a Chinese businessman, co-founder, former CTO and second-largest individual shareholder of Tencent, a Chinese internet company
- Yang Huiyan, the majority shareholder (55%) of Country Garden Holdings
- Lawrence Ho, Hong Kong businessman, chairman and CEO of Melco International, the chairman and CEO of Melco Crown Entertainment
- Ah Ken, a Chinese American businessman and popular figure in Chinatown, Manhattan
- Dennis Fong, Fong is recognized by the Guinness Book of World Records as the first professional gamer.
- Peter Tham, A former Singaporean stockbroker and the director of Pan-Electric Industries and now a wanted criminal.
- Loke Wan Tho, He was the founder of Cathay Organisation in Singapore and Malaysia
- Eu Tong Sen, leading businessman in Malaya, Singapore and Hong Kong during the late 19th and early 20th century
- Ah Ken, Chinese American businessman and popular figure in Chinatown, Manhattan during the mid-to late 19th century.
- Kathy Chan, Chinese-American entrepreneur and investor
- Wesley Chan, early product innovator at Google Inc., best known for founding and launching Google Analytics and Google Voice
- Ming Hsieh, Chinese-American businessman who founded of Cogent Systems, born in Shenyang but his parents are from Guangzhou,

== Arts ==
- Choy Weng Yang, contributions on post-modern arts in Singapore, helped shaped the contemporary art scene in Singapore
- Reagan Louie, an American photographer on sex life.
- Alan Chin (photographer), contributing photographer to Newsweek and The New York Times, editor and photographer at BagNews
- Bernice Bing, Chinese American lesbian artist involved in the San Francisco Bay Area art scene in the 1960s
- Lee Man Fong, A painter who had successful exhibitions in Europe and Asia.
- You Jin, received the Cultural Medallion Award in 2009 for her contributions to Singapore's literary arts scene.

== Martial artists ==
- Ip Man, martial artist and teacher of Bruce Lee.
- Wong Fei-hung, martial artist in the Qing dynasty.
- Wong Kei-ying, father of Wong Fei-hung and one of the members of the Ten Tigers of Canton.
- Donnie Yen, martial artist and actor, one of Asia's highest paid action stars.
- Bruce Lee, one of the most influential martial artists and famous actors of Asian descent of all time.
- Chan Heung, founder of Choy Li Fut

== Authors ==
- Francis Chan, Author of the best-selling book
- Clara Ng, Indonesian writer who is known for both adult fiction and children's literature.
- Amy Tan, Award-winning book seller and subject of controversy
- Jeffery Paul Chan, American author and scholar

== Academics ==
- Flossie Wong-Staal, a virologist and molecular biologist; the first scientist to clone HIV and determine the function of its genes in 1985 in 2007.The Daily Telegraph heralded Dr. Wong-Staal as No. 32 of the "Top 100 Living Geniuses."
- Chu Ching-wu, physicist and one of the first scientists to demonstrate high-temperature superconductivity, in 1987
- Choh Hao Li, Chinese-American biochemist and first scientist to synthesise human growth hormone in 1970
- Wu Ta-You, the "father of Chinese physics"
- Wu Lien-teh, physician and Nobel prize nominee, renowned for his work in public health, particularly the Manchurian plague (1910–11).
- Vivian Wing-Wah Yam, chemist known for her work on light-emitting materials and solar energy
- Albert Chan, professor of chemistry and traditional Chinese medicine
- Liang Sili, rocket and missile control system scientist
- Nancy Ip – member of the Chinese Academy of Sciences and the World Academy of Sciences
- Albert Chan (professor) – a Hong Kong professor of chemistry and traditional Chinese medicine.
- Liang Sili – Chief Designer of inertial guidance platforms for Chinese ballistic
- Yum-Tong Siu – the William Elwood Byerly Professor of Mathematics at Harvard University

== Other notable figures ==
- Moy Lin-shin, Taoist monk and founder of International Taoist Tai Chi Society
- Feng Joe Guey, Chinese aviation pioneer
- Liang Sicheng, the "father of modern Chinese architecture"
- Dai Ailian, the "mother of Chinese modern dance"
- Lee Ya-Ching, pioneering aviator and actress
- Chang Apana A famous Hawaiian detective who influenced many fictional works.
- Ye Xiaogang, China's most active and most famous composers of contemporary classical music.
- Venerable Jing Run, Buddhist abbess and was known as Singapore's "grand dame of charity" in recognition of her lifelong devotion in helping the old and needy.
- Jessica Soho, Filipino journalist and multimedia host. She is a paternal granddaughter of a Chinese immigrant from Kaiping, Guangdong, China who moved to the Philippines in the early 20th century.
- Firdaus Wong Wai Hung, controversial Malaysian Islamic preacher who stirred up controversy regarding the issue of secret conversion of minors to Islam without their parents' knowledge, and his spotting of blasphemous socks sold in a convenience store.
