= Cantonese people =

Han Chinese ethnic subgroup

Cantonese
廣府人 / 广府人 粵人
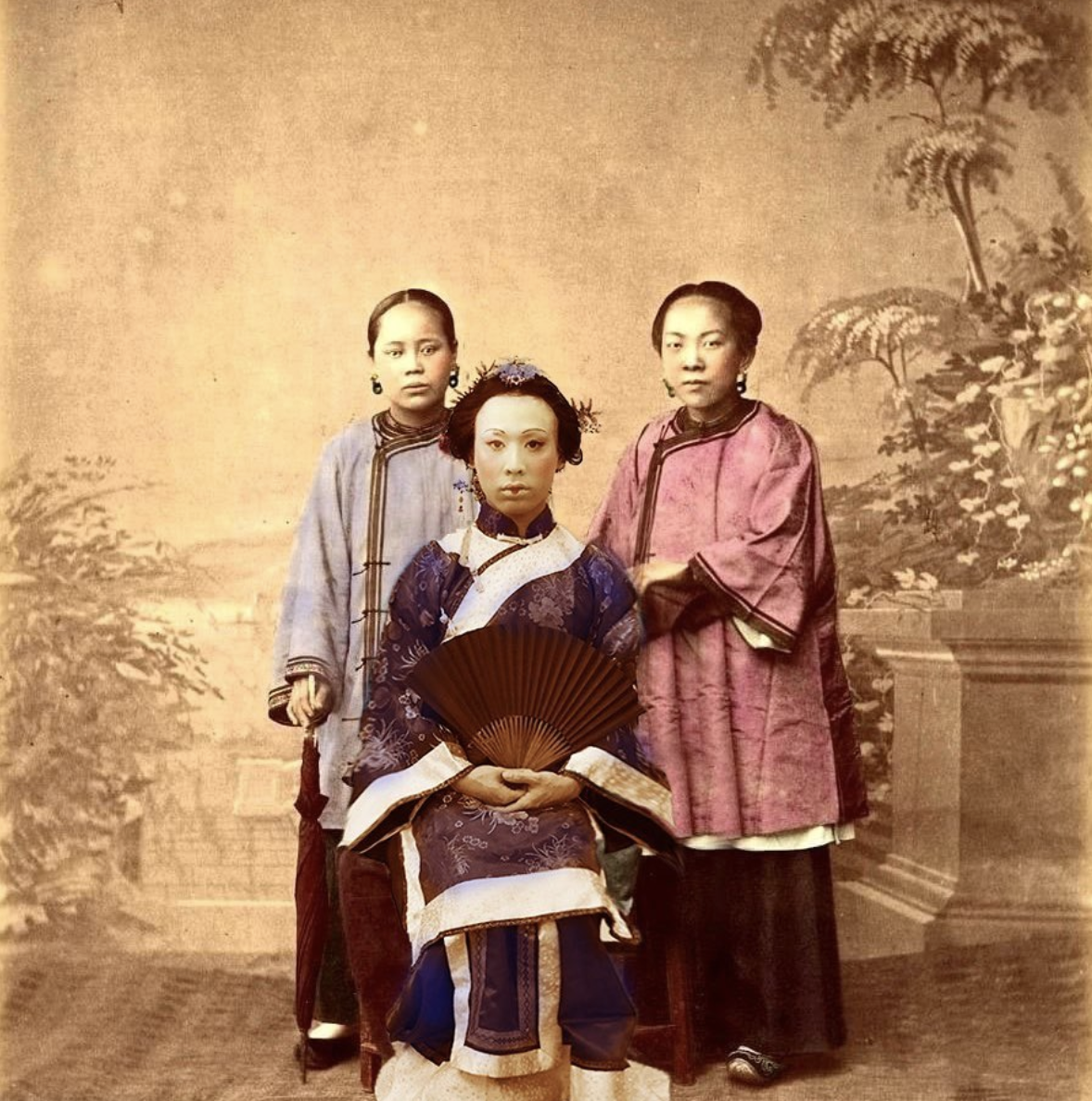
- Cantonese noblewoman and servants by Scotty So. The image was created by contemporary Australian artist Scotty So in which he inserts himself in drag as the noblewoman into an archival image of cantonese women.

Total population
- 86 million (Note: Number of L1 Yue Chinese speakers)

Regions with significant populations
- China (Guangdong, Guangxi, Hainan, Hong Kong and Macau); Southeast Asia (Malaysia, Vietnam, Cambodia, Thailand, Laos, Singapore, Indonesia, Myanmar and Philippines); Other countries (including United States, Canada, Mexico, Peru, United Kingdom, Australia and New Zealand)

Languages
- Cantonese, Taishanese and other Yue languages (native languages), Standard Chinese, Vietnamese, Malaysian, Filipino, Thai, Lao, Khmer, Burmese and Indonesian, Hong Kong English, Macau Portuguese

Religion
- Predominantly Chinese folk religions (which include Confucianism, Taoism, ancestral worship) and Mahayana Buddhism; Minorities: Christianity, Atheism, Islam, Freethought, others

Related ethnic groups
- Taishanese people, other Han Chinese subgroups Kra–Dai-speaking peoples
- Population total based on speaker counts and may not reflect the total population with ancestry.

Cantonese people
- Traditional Chinese: 廣府人
- Simplified Chinese: 广府人
Transcriptions
Standard Mandarin
- Hanyu Pinyin: Guǎngfǔ Rén
- Bopomofo: ㄍㄨㄤˇ ㄈㄨˇ ㄖㄣˊ
- Wade–Giles: Kuang^{3}-fu^{3} Jen^{2}
- Tongyong Pinyin: Guǎng-fǔ Rén
- IPA: [kwàŋ.fù.ɻə̌n]
Yue: Cantonese
- Yale Romanization: Gwóngfú Yàhn
- Jyutping: gwong2 fu2 jan4
- IPA: [kʷɔŋ˧˥.fu˧˥.jɐn˩]

Alternative Chinese name
- Traditional Chinese: 粵人
- Simplified Chinese: 粤人
Transcriptions
Standard Mandarin
- Hanyu Pinyin: Yuè Rén
- Bopomofo: ㄩㄝˋ ㄖㄣˊ
- Wade–Giles: Yüeh^{4} Jen^{2} Yo^{4} Jen^{2}
- Tongyong Pinyin: Yuè Rén
- IPA: [ɥê.ɻə̌n]
Yue: Cantonese
- Yale Romanization: Yuht Yàhn
- Jyutping: jyut6 jan4
- IPA: [jyt̚˨.jɐn˩]

Second alternative Chinese name
- Traditional Chinese: 廣州人
- Simplified Chinese: 广州人
- Literal meaning: Guangzhou (Canton City) People
Transcriptions
Standard Mandarin
- Hanyu Pinyin: Guǎngzhōu Rén
- Bopomofo: ㄍㄨㄤˇ ㄓㄡ ㄖㄣˊ
- Wade–Giles: Kuang^{3}-chou^{1} Jen^{2}
- Tongyong Pinyin: Guǎngjhou Rén
- IPA: [kwàŋ.ʈʂóʊ.ɻə̌n]
Yue: Cantonese
- Yale Romanization: Gwóngjàu Yàhn
- Jyutping: gwong2 zau1 jan4
- IPA: [kʷɔŋ˧˥.tsɐw˥.jɐn˩]

The Cantonese people (traditional Chinese: 廣府人; simplified Chinese: 广府人; Jyutping: gwong2 fu2 jan4; Cantonese Yale: Gwóngfú Yàhn) or Yue people (粵人; jyut6 jan4; Yuht Yàhn), are a Han Chinese sub-ethnic group originating from Guangzhou and its surrounding cities and towns (as well as Hong Kong and Macau), who natively speak Cantonese. In a more general sense, "Cantonese people" can refer to any Han Chinese originating from or residing in the provinces of Guangdong and Guangxi (collectively known as Liangguang), or it may refer to the inhabitants of Guangdong province alone.

Historically centred around Guangzhou and the surrounding Pearl River Delta, the Cantonese people established the Cantonese language as the dominant one in Hong Kong and Macau during their 19th century migrations within the times of the British and Portuguese colonial eras respectively. Cantonese remains today as a majority language in Guangdong and Guangxi, despite the increasing influence of Mandarin.

Speakers of other Yue Chinese varieties, such as Taishanese, may or may not be classified as Cantonese depending on whether the term is defined strictly by the prestige Guangzhou dialect (Standard Cantonese) or by the wider Yue linguistic branch. Because the English term "Cantonese" has no single direct equivalent in Chinese, variously mapping the term to Guangzhou (the city), Guangfu (the Pearl River Delta cultural core), Yue (the broader linguistic group), or Guangdong (the province), its scope shifts depending on context. Non-Yue Sinitic groups residing in Guangdong, such as the Hakka and Min-speaking populations (including Teochew, Hoklo, and Leizhounese), are generally distinguished from the Cantonese identity on linguistic and cultural grounds, though they are occasionally grouped under the label in broader geographic contexts.

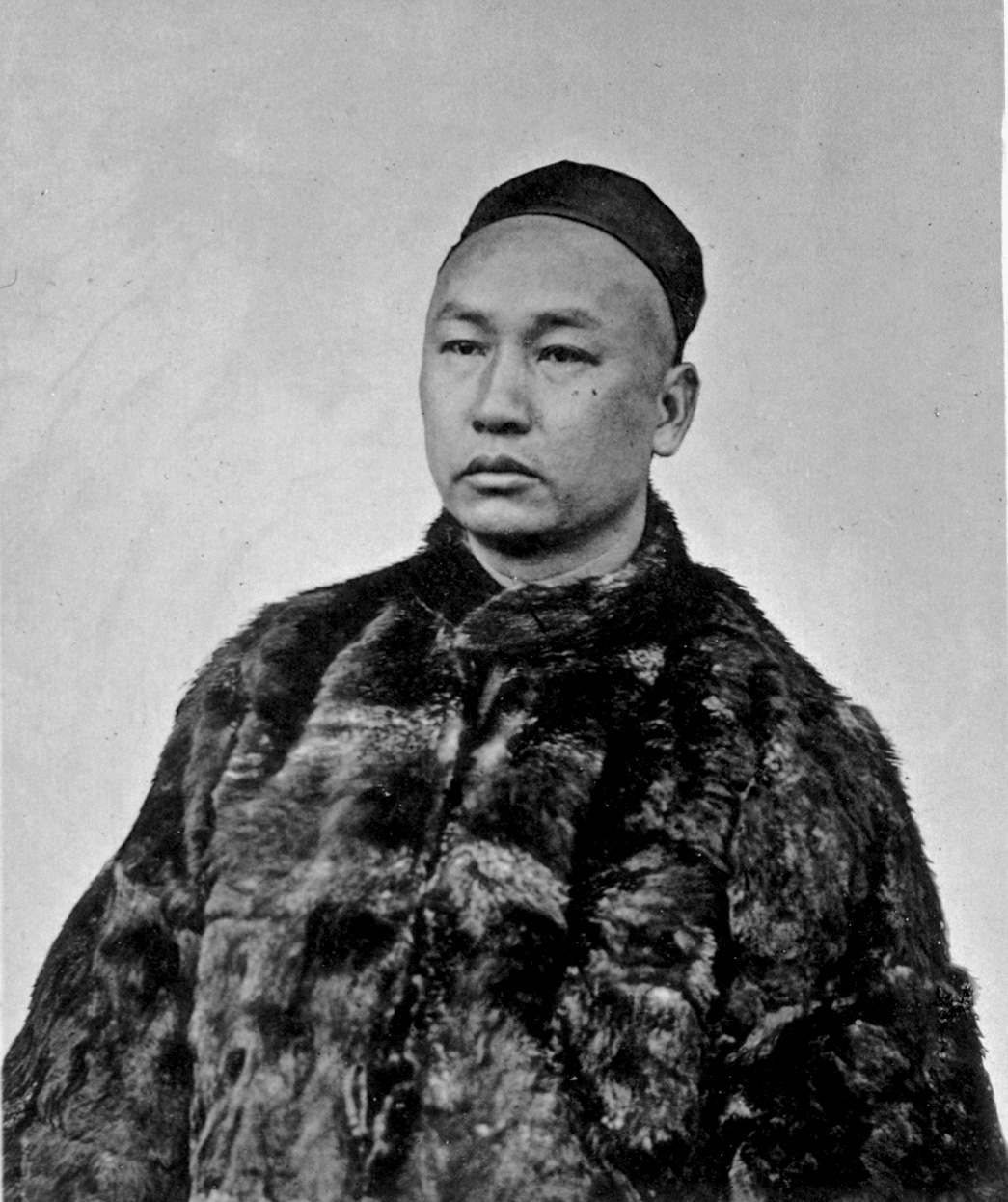
Photo of a Cantonese gentleman during the Qing era

Map of Liangguang

== Terminology ==
"Cantonese" has been generally used to describe all Chinese people from Guangdong since the term is commonly treated as a synonym for it, and the Cantonese language is regularly viewed as the sole linguistic representation of the entire region. This is often considered inaccurate as "Canton" itself technically only refers to the capital Guangzhou historically, and the Cantonese language usually specifically refers to only the Guangzhou dialect of the Yue Chinese languages linguistically. However, modern usage of the term can be very flexible, as David Faure points out that there is no direct Chinese translation of the English term "Cantonese". People living in Guangdong and Guangxi may speak other Yue dialects or dialects from other Chinese language groups such as Mandarin, Min, Hakka, and Pinghua.

The English name "Canton" derived from Portuguese Cantão or Cidade de Cantão, a muddling of dialectical pronunciations of "Guangdong" (e.g., Hakka Kóng-tûng). Although the term was originally and predominantly applied to the walled city of Guangzhou, it was frequently conflated with Guangdong by Western authors. (Note: The lexicographer only accepted Canton as a proper noun referring to the city, and considered usages with reference to the province as an "ellipsis", see Yule & al.) (Note: A. Hamilton (1727) used Canton to refer to both the city and the province. But he used Canton for the city more frequently in the same work, especially when he wrote Canton without reference to "Quangtung". See Hamilton (1727; pp.224-238)) Within Guangdong and Guangxi, Cantonese is considered the prestige dialect and is called baahk wá, [pàːk wǎː] (白話) which means "vernacular". It is also known as "Guangzhou speech" (广州话; 廣州話; gwong2 zau1 waa6).

Other Yue peoples are sometimes labelled as "Cantonese" such as the Taishanese people (四邑粵人; sei yāp yuht yàhn), even though Taishanese (台山話) has low intelligibility with Standard Cantonese. Whether speakers of other Yue varieties are included depends on which Sinitic concept the English term "Cantonese" is mapped to in context. By contrast, non-Yue Sinitic groups residing in Guangdong—such as the Hakka and Min-speaking (Teochew, Hoklo, and Leizhounese) populations are typically differentiated from the Cantonese identity on linguistic and cultural grounds. Consequently, definitions of "Cantonese" range from specifically referring to people originating from Guangzhou and the adjacent Guangfu cultural region, or native speakers of the prestige Guangzhou dialect, to anyone born in or tracing ancestry to the broader Liangguang region.

== Genetics ==
Cantonese people are predominantly of Han Chinese ancestry, with various local genetic clusters suggesting regional language-based endogamy. As with other Han Chinese from Guangdong, they have Kra-Dai ancestry and exhibit ancient admixture with Taiwanese aborigines, like Ami and Atayal, which was similarly observed for Han Chinese from Fujian and Sichuan and the ancestors of Taiwanese Han. They also have Neolithic Mekong-related ancestry but this is less significant (21.8–23.6%), which was similarly observed for Han Chinese from Fujian.

Overall, Cantonese represent the southernmost Han sub-group although other genetic studies suggest that Fujianese and Taiwanese Han are equally as southern. They allegedly split from northern Han the earliest, dating from the Qin to Tang dynasty, compared to other Guangdong sub-groups like Hakka, whom they later intermixed with along with Teochew. Out of the Sino-Tibetan-speaking groups, they share the highest affinities with Taiwanese Han and Singaporean Chinese. Han Chinese from the Pearl River Delta region also show high affinities with Han Chinese from Hainan and Xiamen and Australian Asians although the locals of Hong Kong and Macau have slight genetic differences. Along with other Lingnan Han, Cantonese people cluster with Kinh Vietnamese but other studies show higher affinities between Dai people and Kinh Vietnamese.

Because of their native southern ancestry, they slightly differ from other Han subgroups in skin tone, build, stature and having a higher incidence of certain diseases such as nasopharyngeal cancer. According to a 2012 study, Cantonese usually have similar physical characteristics to Han from Jiangxi, including the predominance of mesocephalic and hypsicephalic types, darker skin in males, thin lips, thin eye slits with higher external angles and less 'mongoloid folds', straight nasal profiles with medium-high nasal roots etc. Due to speaking a tonal language, Cantonese speakers are often better at musical pitch perception than rhythm perception, compared to English and French speakers.

Among the Han Chinese of Dongguan, Guangdong, southern-prevalent maternal haplogroups, such as R9 (20.8%), B (17.9%), M7b (14.2%) prevail. In contrast, the frequencies of northern-prevalent haplogroups (with the exception of D) are quite low: C (1.9%), G2 (1.9%) and Z (1.9%). Overall, Guangdong populations belong to the southern-prevalent maternal haplogroups B, R9, and M7 (Dongguan: 57.5%; Guangzhou: 69.3%; Hong Kong: 60.0%), except for Zhanjiang populations (46.6%). Several subhaplogroups, such as B4a, F3a, M7b, and M10, were also shared among Dongguan, Guangzhou, and Hong Kong populations but absent in Zhanjiang populations, which is consistent with their geographic proximity. Except for Hong Kong populations (5.0%), haplogroup D was also present in the rest three populations with high distribution frequencies (>14%). M8 (embracing M8a, C, and Z), a northern-prevalent haplogroup shows relatively higher frequency in the Dongguan population (9.4%). Paternal haplogroup O-M175 (89.5%) and its sublineage O3-M122 (~56%) are also common in Han Chinese from Macau and there is no evidence of male-mediated Portuguese influence despite their long-lasting presence.

== History ==
=== Pre-19th century: History of Liangguang ===
Until the 19th century, Cantonese history was largely the history of Guangdong and Guangxi, collectively known as Liangguang or Guangnan.

Throughout history, there have been multiple migrations of Han people from the Central Plains into the region that is now southeastern and southern China. The first Chinese presence in Guangdong can be traced to the conquest by the Qin general Zhao Tuo and his subsequent establishment of the Nanyue kingdom, a hybrid Han-Yue polity as an independent state. There was a second wave of migration during the Han dynasty during the troubled reign of the usurper Wang Mang. However, it was only under much later dynasties such as the Jin dynasty, the Tang dynasty, and the Song dynasty, when major waves of Han Chinese began to migrate south into Guangdong and Guangxi, that the region acquired the cultural characteristics that last until the present day.

Formation of Nanyue kingdom

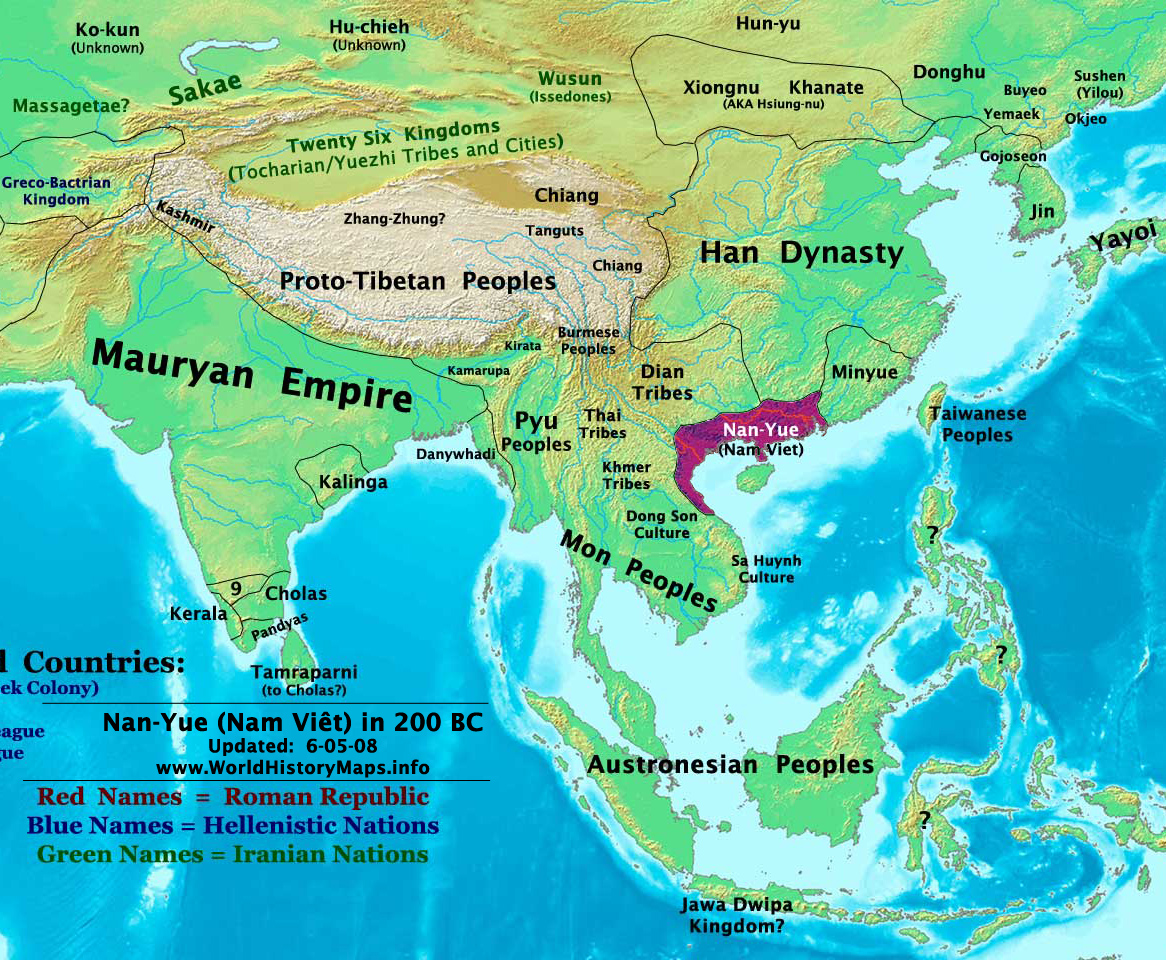
Nanyue (Nàahm'yuht in Cantonese Yale) Kingdom

What is now Guangdong and later Guangxi, was first brought under Qin influence by a general named Zhao Tuo, who conquered the region in 214 BC and later, after the collapse of the Qin empire, founded the independent kingdom of Nanyue in 204 BC. Zhao Tuo's retinue included hundreds of thousands of predominantly male Qin conscripts, and he is recorded as petitioning the Qin Emperor for 30,000 wives from the Central Plains for his restless soldiers. Following the collapse of central authority in the Qin Empire, the Han Chinese soldiers, conscripts, and labourers under Zhao Tuo's command were incorporated into the Nanyue kingdom and ordered to mix with the local inhabitants.

Like the founder Zhao Tuo, the aristocratic elite and military class of the newly formed Nanyue state were of Central Plains origin and mediated the transmission of Han culture to the local inhabitants. Grave goods and burial pits show a significant and immediate cultural shift at the time of Nanyue's establishment, especially in larger tombs, which began to deploy Han Chinese features such as ramps and compartmentalised coffins, and to contain traditional Han Chinese drinking vessels such as the hu, he, and ding as well as incense burners such as the xun lu. Buildings began to feature architectural elements from the Central Plains, including covered galleries, drains, stone lintels, and columnar bases. The Han aristocratic elite, however, did adopt features of the Bai Yue culture, including the use of feathered headdresses as represented on Nanyue cauldrons, in order to bolster their authority among the indigenous people in the new hybrid Han-Yue polity.

The Nanyue kingdom, which was led by a Han aristocracy and adopted Han bureaucratic structures, and which adopted a policy of assimilation and fusion with the native Bai Yue, then went on to become the strongest state on the southern periphery of the Han, with many neighbouring kingdoms declaring their allegiance to Nanyue rule. Zhao Tuo took the Han territory of Hunan and defeated the Han dynasty's first attack on Nanyue, later annexing the kingdom of Minyue in the east and conquering Âu Lạc, Northern Vietnam, in the west in 179 BC.

The greatly expanded Nanyue kingdom included the territories of modern-day Guangdong, Guangxi and Northern Vietnam (Tonkin), with the capital situated at modern-day Guangzhou. The people of Liangguang remained autonomous until formally incorporated into the Han dynasty in 111 BC, following the Han–Nanyue War.

Incorporation into Han territory

Liangguang was incorporated into the Han dynasty in 111 BC, following the Han–Nanyue War. From this point on, it was directly administered by the Han Empire.

Han Empire

During the troubled period of Wang Mang's reign in the Han dynasty (206BC–220AD), there were influxes of Han Chinese migrants into Guangdong and Guangxi, western coast of Hainan, Annam (now Northern Vietnam) and Eastern Yunnan.

4th-12th century AD

During the 4th–12th centuries, yet more waves of Han Chinese people from the Central Plains migrated and settled in the South of China. This gave rise to peoples, including the Cantonese themselves, and the other dialect groups of Guangdong during the Tang dynasty including the Hakka and the Teochew. Waves of migration and intermarriage meant that the indigenous populations of both Guangxi and Guangdong provinces were either assimilated or displaced, but some native groups like the Zhuangs remain.

One notable migration occurred in the aftermath of the deadly An Lushan rebellion in the Tang dynasty, which led to a massive southward migration by people from the Tang heartland into the Panyu area, causing a 75% increase in the population on household registers. Unsurprisingly, the Cantonese often call themselves "people of Tang" (唐人; tòhng yàhn). This is because Han immigration and the intermarriage with and acculturation of indigenous tribes reached a critical mass during the Tang dynasty, creating a new local identity among the Liangguang peoples. The origin of the Cantonese people is thus said to be Han people from the Central Plains who migrated to Guangdong and Guangxi in multiple successive waves of settlement while it was still inhabited by Baiyue peoples.

=== 19th–20th century: Turmoil and migration ===
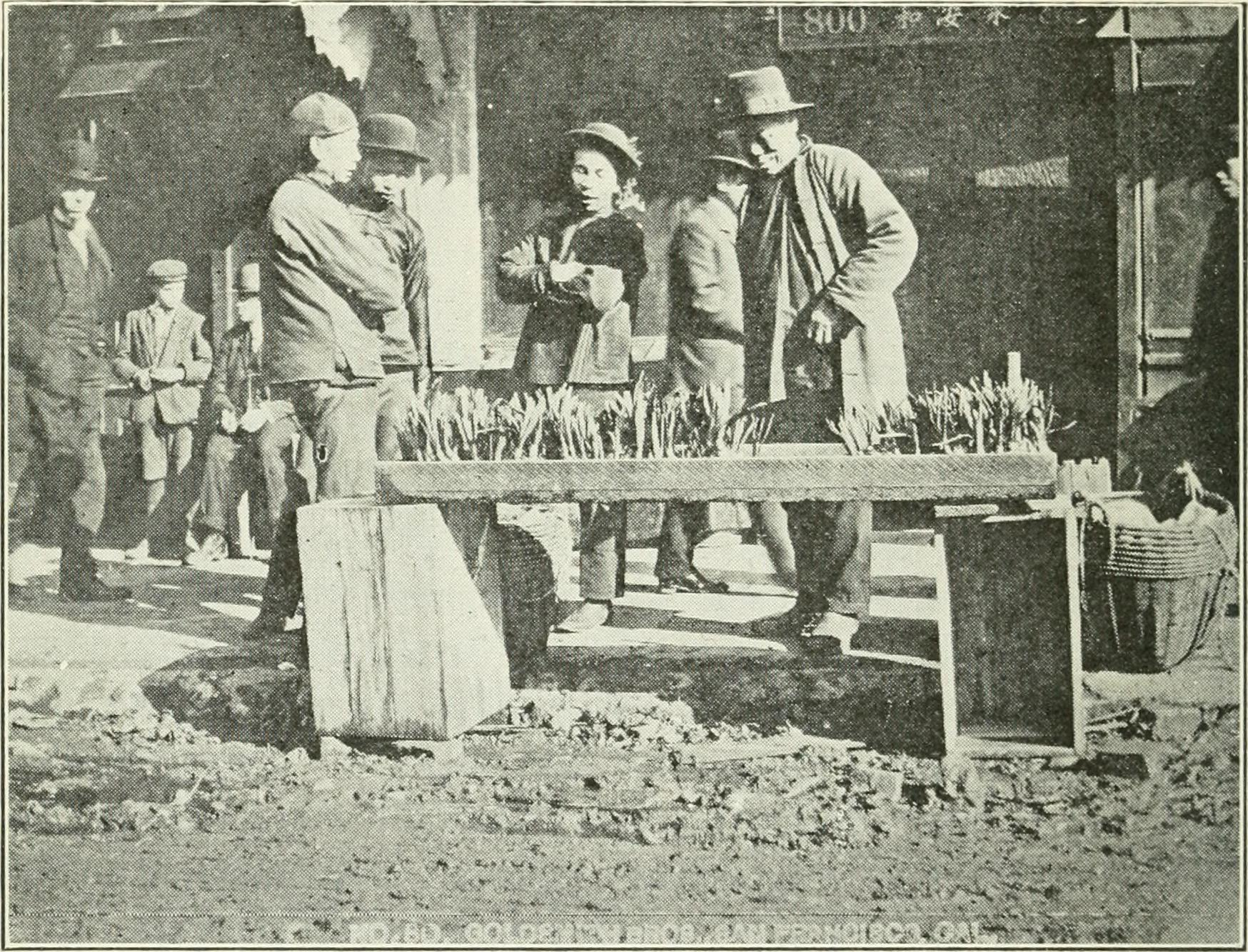
Cantonese bazaar during Chinese New Year at the Grant Avenue, San Francisco, circa 1914. Names of shops are in Cantonese and there are four daily newspapers printed in the Cantonese language at that time, as there were already a significant number of Cantonese people who had been there for generations.

During the early 1800s, conflict occurred between Cantonese and Portuguese pirates in the form of the Ningpo massacre after the defeat of Portuguese pirates. The First (1839–1842) and Second Opium Wars (1856–1860) led to the loss of China's control over Hong Kong and Kowloon, which were ceded to the British Empire. Macau also became a Portuguese settlement. Between 1855 and 1867, the Punti–Hakka Clan Wars caused further discord in Guangdong and Guangxi. The third plague pandemic of 1855 broke out in Yunnan and spread to the Liangguang region via Guangxi, killing thousands and spreading via water traffic to nearby Hong Kong and Macau.

The turmoil of the 19th century, followed by the political upheaval of the early 20th century, compelled many residents of Guangdong to migrate overseas in search of a better future. Up until the second half of the 20th century, the majority of overseas Chinese emigrated from two provinces of China; Guangdong and Fujian. As a result, there are today many Cantonese communities throughout the world, including in Southeast Asia, the Pacific Islands, the Americas, the Caribbean and Western Europe, with Chinatowns commonly being established by Cantonese communities. There have been a large number of interracial marriages between Cantonese men and women from other nations (especially from Cuba, Peru, Mexico), as most of the Cantonese migrants were men. As a result, there are many Afro-Caribbeans and South American people of Cantonese descent including many Eurasians.

Unlike the migrants from Fujian, who mostly settled in Southeast Asia, many Cantonese emigrants also migrated to the Western Hemisphere, particularly the United States, Canada, Australia and New Zealand and Burma. Many Cantonese immigrants into the United States became railroad labourers, while many in South America were brought in as coolies. Cantonese immigrants in the United States and Australia participated in the California Gold Rush and the Australian gold rushes of 1854 onwards, while those in Hawaii found employment in sugarcane plantations as contract labourers. These early Cantonese immigrants variously faced hostility and a variety of discriminatory laws, including the prohibition of Chinese female immigrants. The relaxation of immigration laws after World War II allowed for subsequent waves of migration to the Western world from southeastern mainland China, Hong Kong, and Macau. As a result, Cantonese continues to be widely used by Chinese communities of Guangdong, Guangxi, Hong Kong and Macau regional origin in the Western hemisphere, and has not been supplanted by the Mandarin-based Standard Chinese. A large proportion of the early migrants also came from the Siyi region of Guangdong and spoke Taishanese. The Taishanese variant is still spoken in American Chinese communities, by the older population as well as by more recent immigrants from Taishan, in Jiangmen, Guangdong.

=== Cantonese influence on Xinhai Revolution ===
Cantonese uprising against the Qing Empire in 1895 let to its naming as the "cradle of the Xinhai Revolution". Revolutionary leader Sun Yat-sen was born in Zhongshan, Guangdong. Hong Kong was where he developed his thoughts of revolution and was the base of subsequent uprisings, as well as the first revolutionary newspaper. Sun Yat-sen's revolutionary army was largely made up of Cantonese, and many of the early revolutionary leaders were also Cantonese.

== Cultural hub ==
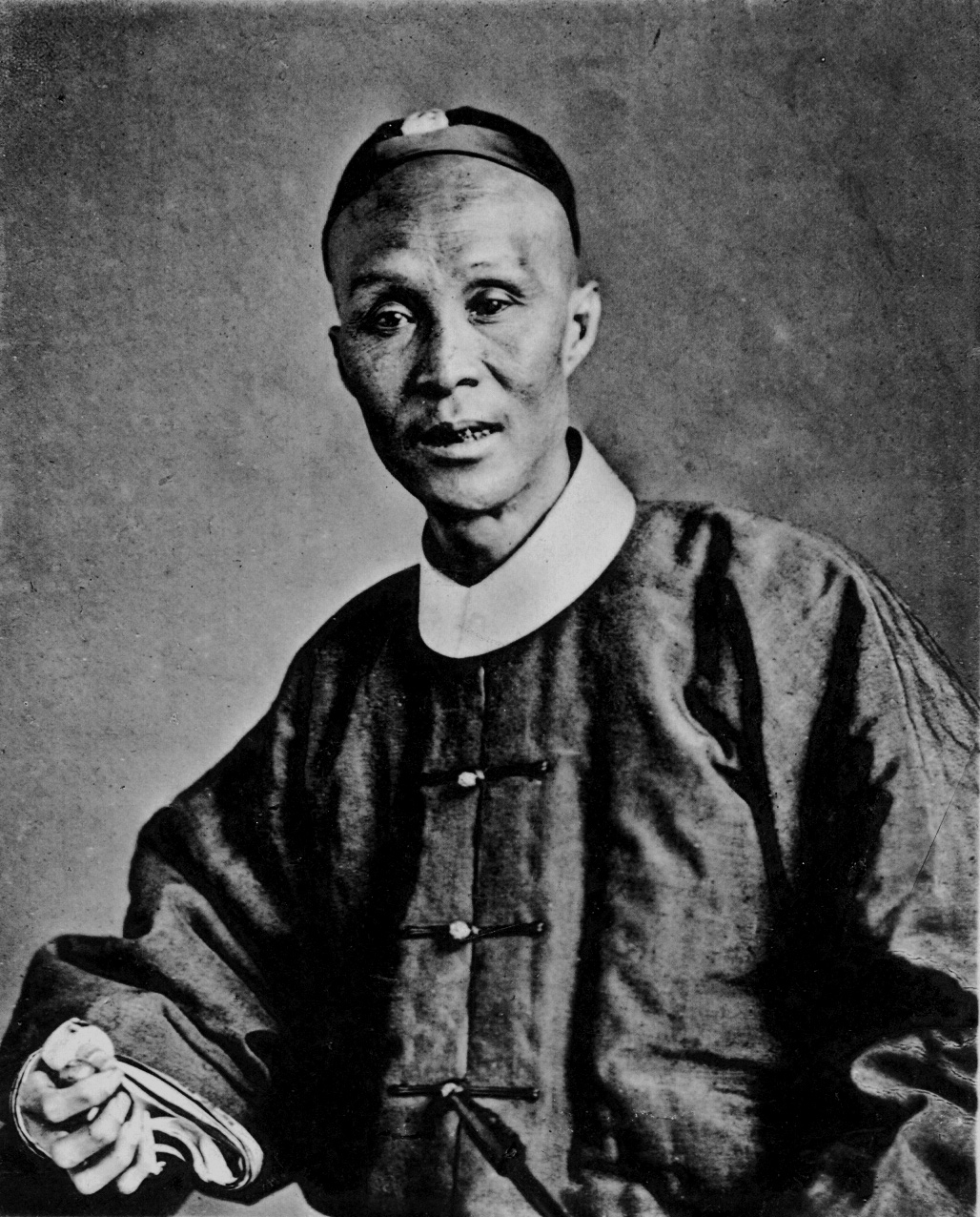
A Cantonese gentleman in Qing-era traditional attire, c. 1873–1874

Cantonese people and their culture are centered in Guangdong, Eastern Guangxi, Hong Kong and Macau.

Guangzhou, the capital of Guangdong, has been one of China's international trading ports since the Tang dynasty. During the 18th century, it became an important centre of the emerging trade between China and the Western world, as part of the Canton System. The privilege during this period made Guangzhou one of the top three cities in the world. Operating from the Thirteen Factories located on the banks of the Pearl River outside Canton, merchants traded goods such as silk, porcelain ("fine china") and tea, allowing Guangzhou to become a prosperous city. Links to overseas contacts and beneficial tax reforms in the 1990s have also contributed to the city's ongoing growth. Guangzhou was named a global city in 2008. The migrant population from other provinces of China in Guangzhou was 40 per cent of the city's total population in 2008. Most of them are rural migrants and they speak only standard Chinese.

Hong Kong and Macau are two of the richest cities in the world in terms of GDP per capita and are autonomous SARs (Special Administrative Regions) that are under independent governance from China. Historically governed by the British and Portuguese empires respectively, colonial Hong Kong and Macau were increasingly populated by migrant influxes from mainland China, particularly the nearby Guangdong Province. For that reason, the culture of Hong Kong and Macau became a mixture of Cantonese and Western influences, sometimes described as "East meets West".

=== Hong Kong ===
Hong Kong Island was first colonised by the British Empire in 1842 with a population of 7,450; however, it was in 1898 that Hong Kong became a British colony, when the British also colonised the New Territories (which constitute 86.2% of Hong Kong's modern territory). It was during this period that migrants from China entered, mainly speaking Cantonese, the prestige variety of Yue Chinese, as a common language. During the following century of British rule, Hong Kong grew into a hub of Cantonese culture and has remained as such since the handover in 1997.

Today Hong Kong is one of the world's leading financial centres and the Hong Kong dollar is the thirteenth most-traded currency in the world.

=== Macau ===
Macau natives are known as the Tanka people. A dialect similar to Shiqi, originating from Zhongshan in Guangdong, is also spoken in the region.

Parts of Macau were first loaned to the Portuguese by China as a trading centre in the 16th century, with the Portuguese required to administer the city under Chinese authority. In 1851 and 1864, the Portuguese Empire occupied the two nearest offshore islands Taipa and Coloane respectively and Macau officially became a colony of the Portuguese Empire in 1887. Macau was returned to China in 1999.

By 2002, Macau had become one of the world's richest cities and by 2006, it had surpassed Las Vegas to become the world's biggest gambling centre. Macau is also a world cultural heritage site due to its Portuguese colonial architecture.

== Culture ==
The term "Cantonese" is used to refer to the native culture, language, and people who can trace their ancestral roots back to the city of Guangzhou. Their influence has spread across the provinces of Guangdong and Guangxi.

There are cultural, economic, political, generational and geographical differences in making "Cantonese-ness" in and beyond Guangdong and Guangxi, with the interacting dynamics of migration, education, social developments and cultural representations.

=== Language ===
The term "Cantonese language" is sometimes used to refer to the broader group of Yue languages and dialects spoken in Guangdong and Guangxi, although it is used more specifically to describe Gwóngjāu wah (廣州話), the prestige variant spoken in Guangzhou. Gwóngjāu wah is the main language used for education, literature and media in Hong Kong and Macau. It is still widely used in Guangzhou, despite the fact that a large proportion of the city's population is made up by migrant workers from elsewhere in China that speak non-Cantonese variants of Chinese and Standard Chinese. Though in recent years it is slowly falling out of favour with the younger generation prompting fears in Cantonese people that the language may die out. Cantonese language's erosion in Guangzhou is due to a mix of suppression of the language and the mass migration of non-Cantonese speaking people in to the area.

Because of its tradition of usage in music, cinema, literature and newspapers, this form of Cantonese is a cultural mark of identity that distinguishes Cantonese people from speakers of other varieties of Chinese, whose languages are prohibited to have strong influences under China's Standard Mandarin policy. The pronunciation and vocabulary of Cantonese has preserved many features of the official language of the Tang dynasty with elements of the ancient Yue language. Written Cantonese is very common in manhua, books, articles, magazines, newspapers, online chat, instant messaging, internet blogs and social networking websites. Anime, cartoons and foreign films are also dubbed in Cantonese. Some videogames such as Sleeping Dogs, Far Cry 4, Grand Theft Auto III and Resident Evil 6 have substantial Cantonese dialogues.

=== Arts ===
Cantonese people have created various schools or styles of arts, with the more prominent being Lingnan architecture, Lingnan school of painting, Canton porcelain, Cantonese opera, Cantonese music, among many others.

Architecture

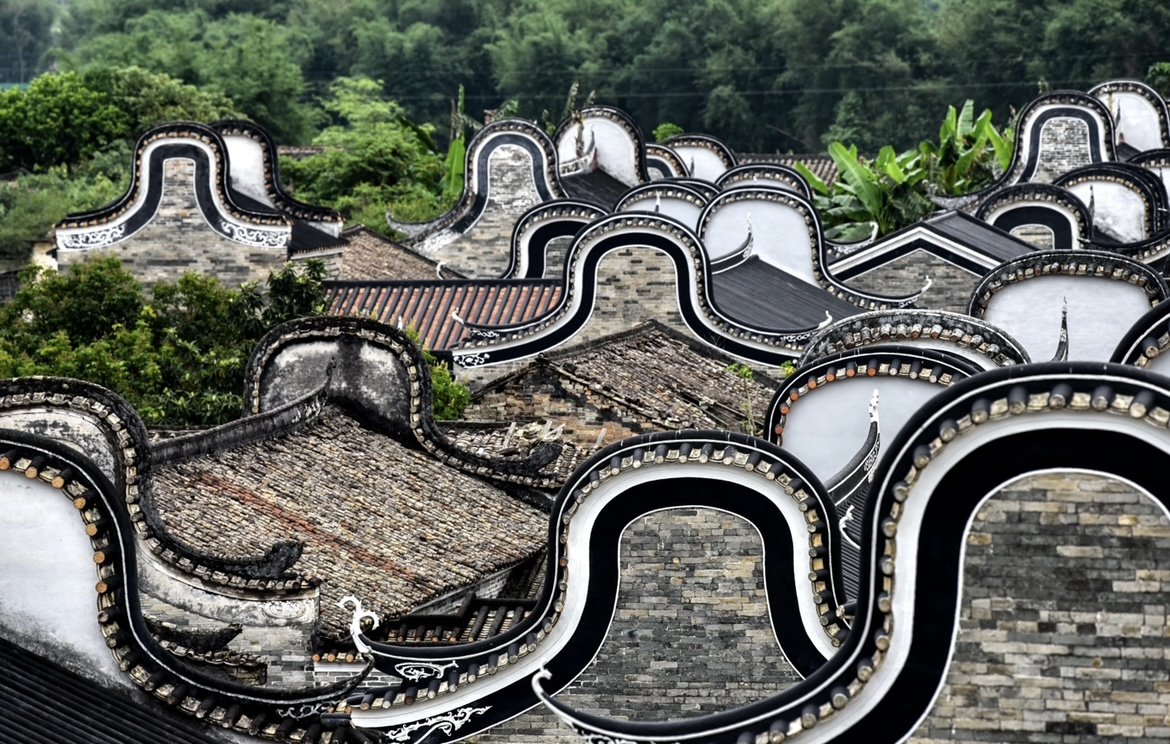
Woerlou style of roof construction, characteristic of Cantonese houses

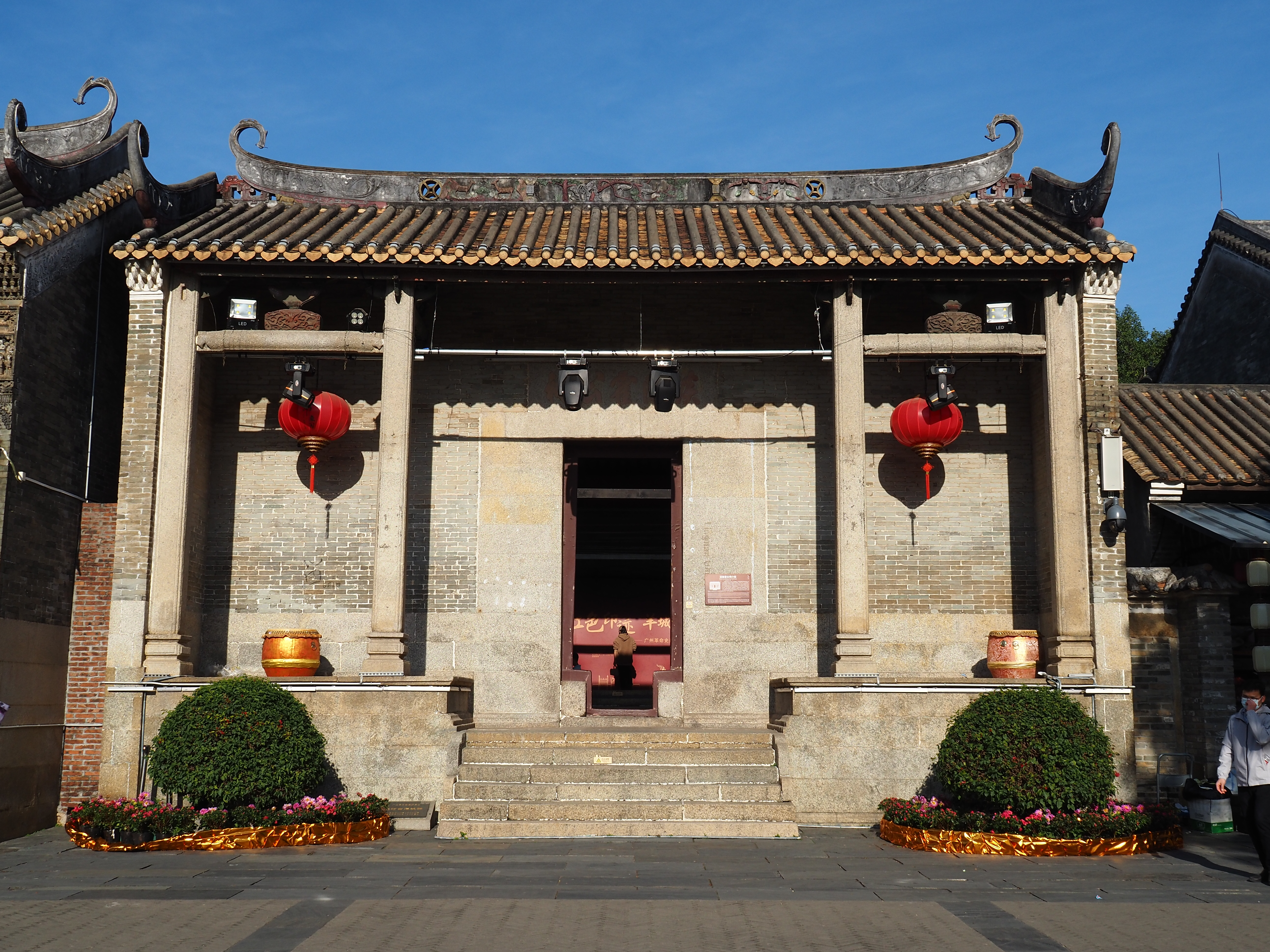
Building in Panyu, Guangdong

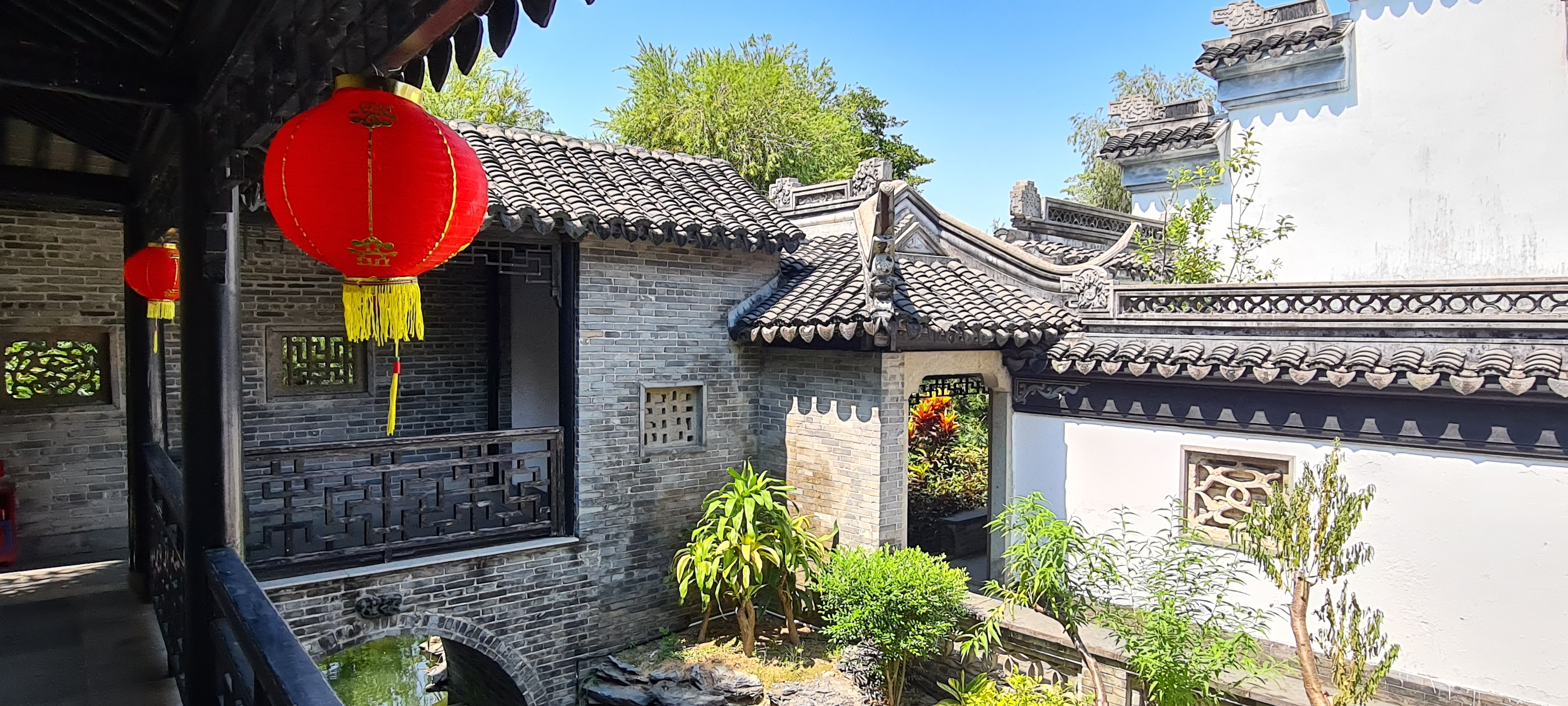
Building in Zhongshan, Guangdong

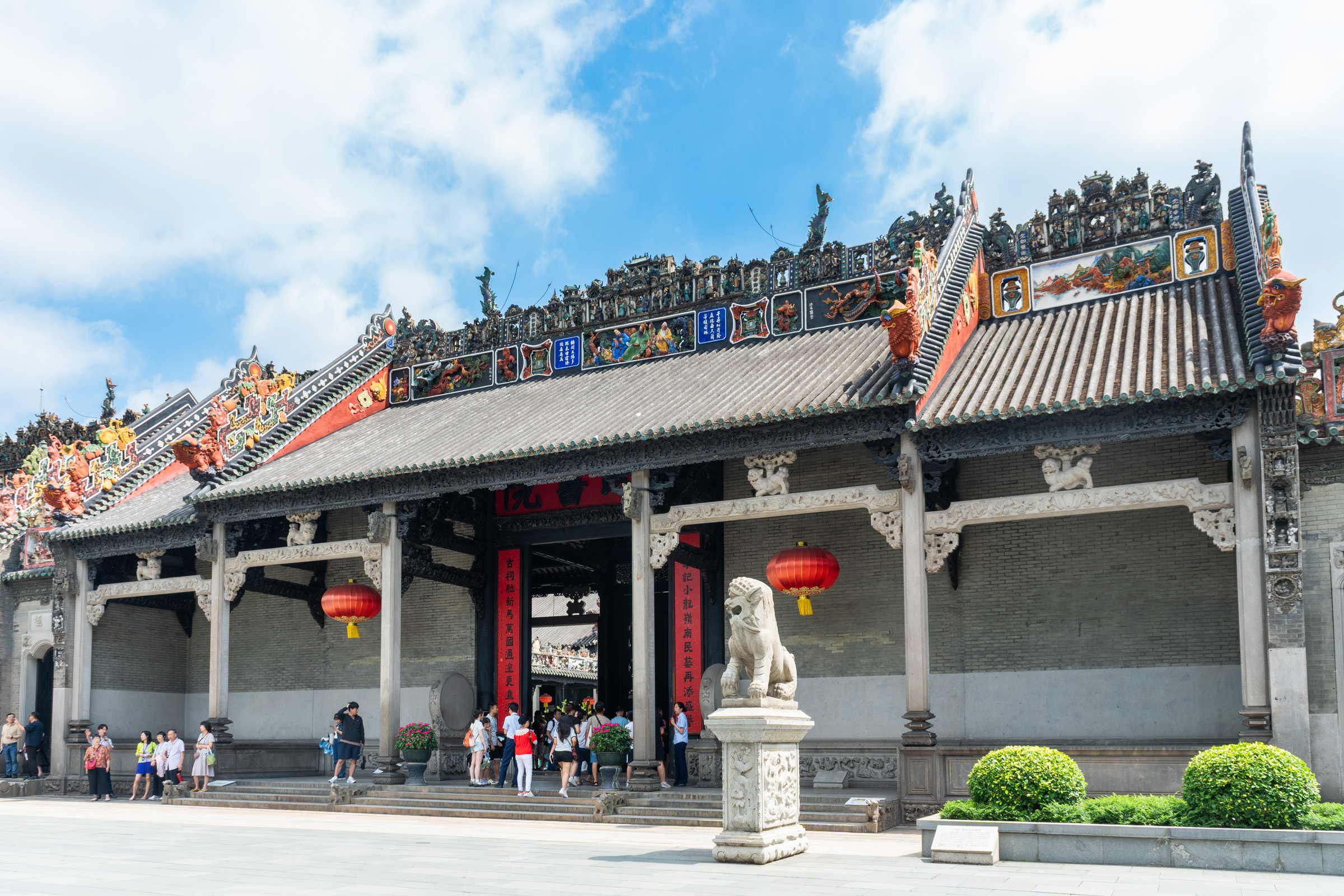
Chen Clan academy

Cantonese architecture or Lingnan architecture favours pale colours such as white and grey-green, demonstrates straight rather than curved roof ridges and the use of "woerlou or omega-shaped structures" at the ends, and employs open structures such as balconies, skylights and verandas to accommodate the tropical climate in the south. Buildings are also generally taller than in the north. It also features narrow structures known as "cold alleys" to promote the increase of windspeed, and thus the cooling and ventilation of buildings.

=== Popular culture ===
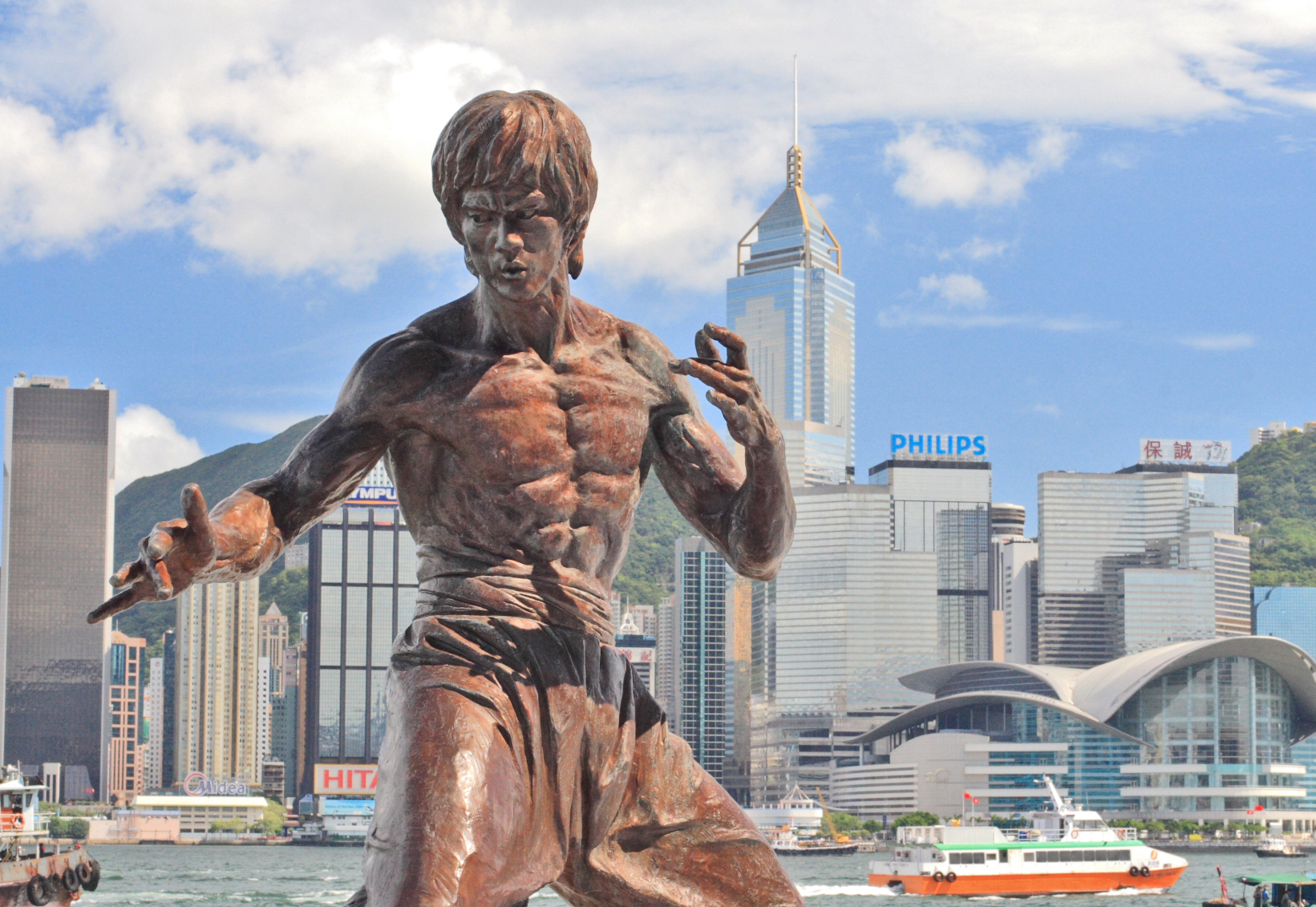
Statue of Cantonese martial artist Bruce Lee at the Avenue of Stars, Hong Kong

Cantopop during its early glory had spread to mainland China, Taiwan, Japan, Singapore, Malaysia and Indonesia. Well-known Cantopop singers include Andy Lau, Aaron Kwok, Joey Yung, Alan Tam, Roman Tam, Anita Mui, Danny Chan, Leslie Cheung, Jacky Cheung, Leon Lai, Sammi Cheng and Coco Lee, many of whom are of Cantonese or Taishanese origin.

The Hong Kong movie industry was the third-largest movie industry in the world (after Hollywood and Bollywood) for decades throughout the 20th century, with Cantonese-language films viewed and acclaimed around the world for its innovative style.

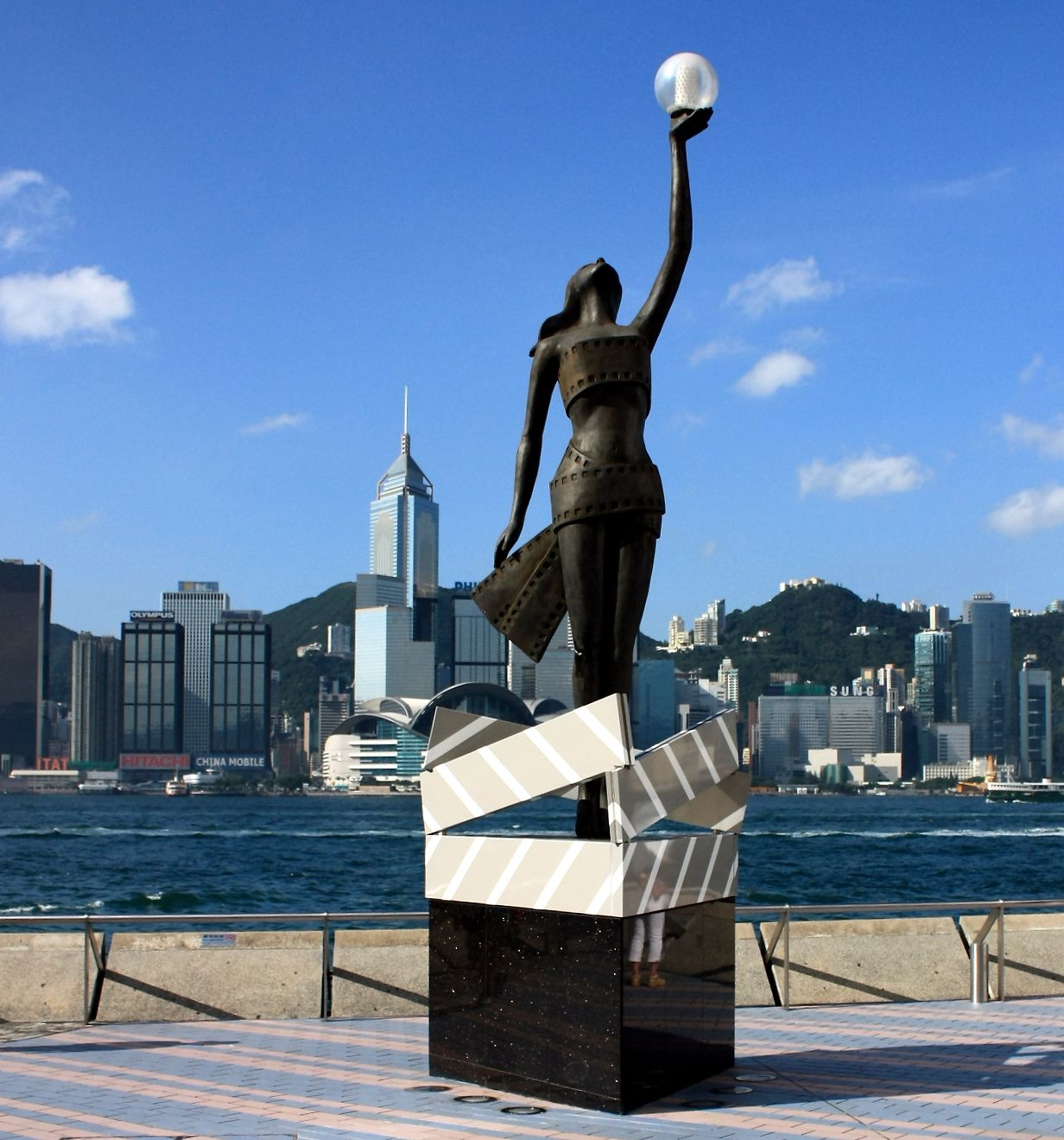
A statue on the Avenue of Stars, a tribute to Hong Kong Cantonese cinema

Cantonese popular culture through the medium Hong Kong cinema has been responsible for pioneering the development of new genres and styles and paving the path for the rest of Chinese cinema. These innovations include the development of action-comedy genre exemplified in movies such as the God of Gamblers, the pioneering of the comedy-horror genre seen in Mr Vampire, the popularisation Chinese cultivation fantasy fiction genres as seen in cult classics and experimental movies rich in special effects such as Chinese Ghost Story and Zu Warriors from Magic Mountain, and leading the way for the use of complex choreography and stunts through Jackie Chan movies such as Police Story.

Recent films include Kung Fu Hustle, Shaolin Soccer, Infernal Affairs and Ip Man 3.

=== Cuisine ===
Cantonese cuisine is one of the "Great Eight Traditions" of Chinese cuisine, has become one of the most renowned types of cuisine around the world, characterised by its variety of cooking methods and use of fresh ingredients, particularly seafood. One of the most famous examples of Cantonese cuisine is dim sum, a variety of small and light dishes such as har gow (steamed shrimp dumplings), siu mai (steamed pork dumplings) and cha siu bao (barbecued pork buns).

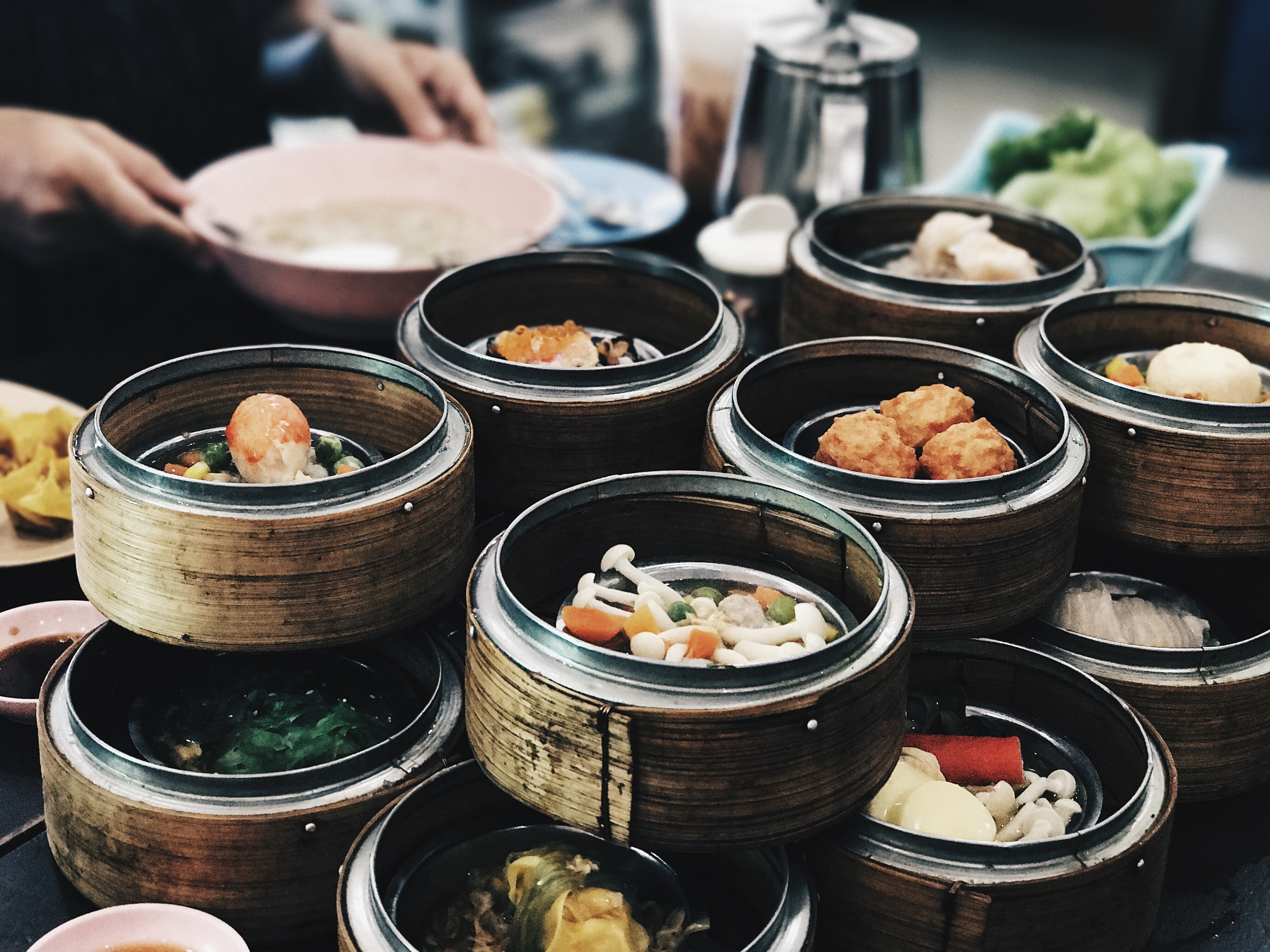
Dim Sum, a characteristic part of Cantonese cuisine

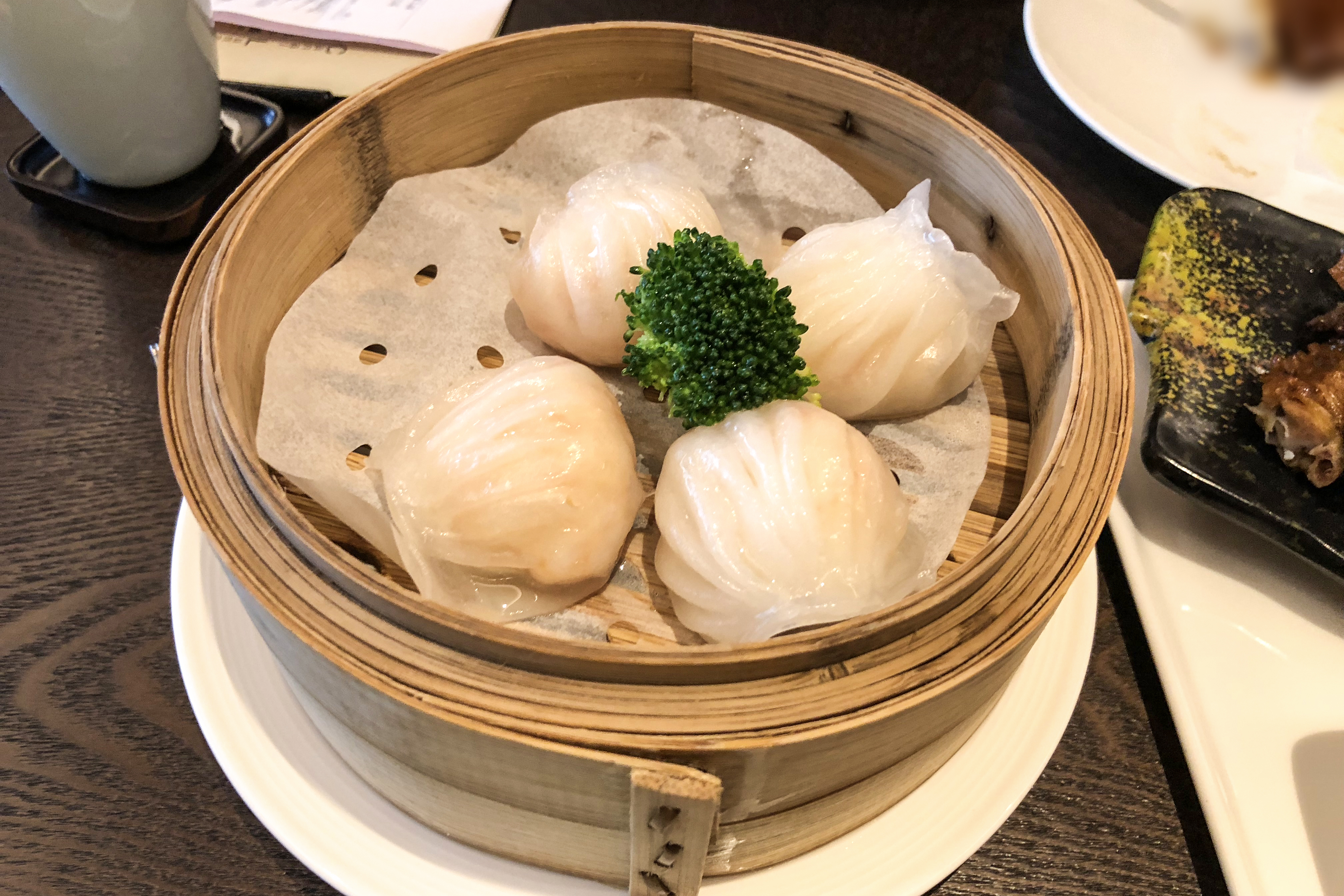
Har Gow Dim Sum

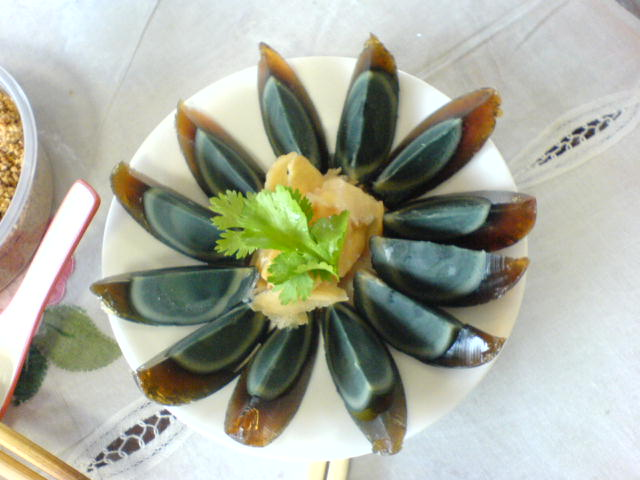
Century Egg, a fermented type of hardboiled egg

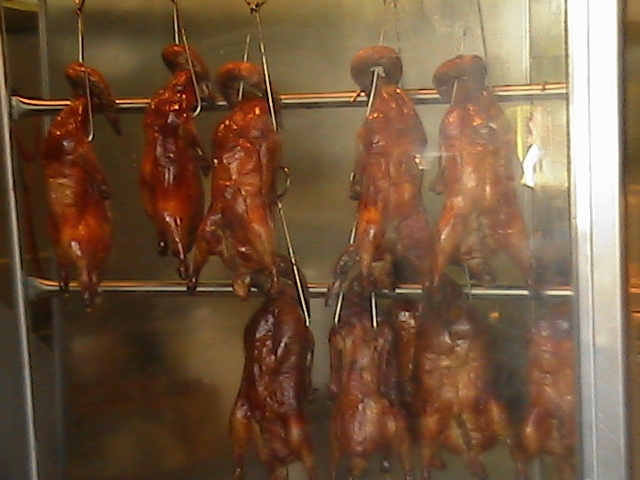
Roast duck, an important part of Cantonese cuisine

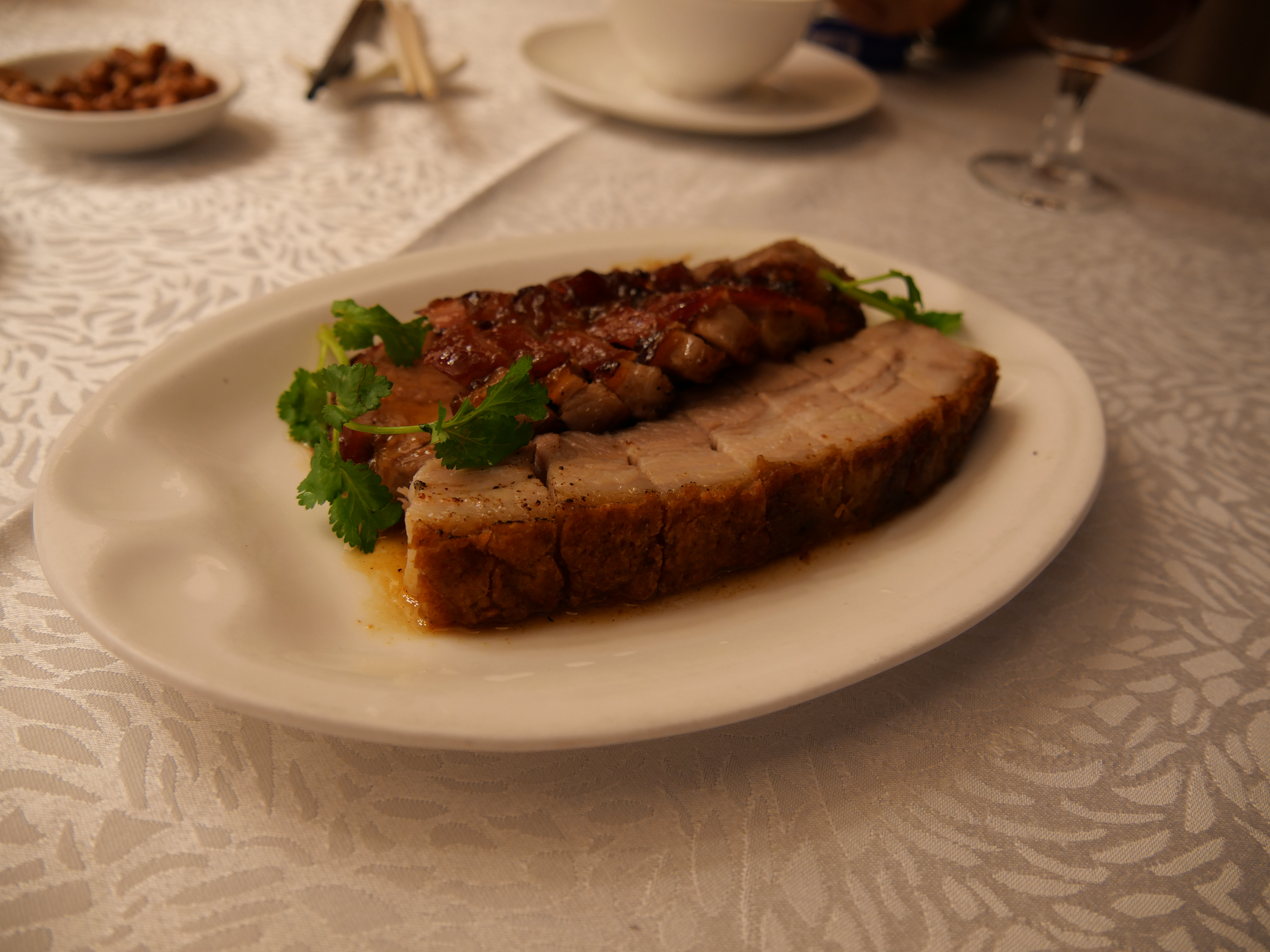
Char Siu, a characteristic Cantonese dish

== Notable figures ==
This is an incomplete list of notable Cantonese people.

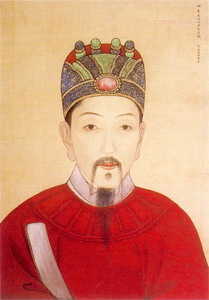
Yuan Chonghuan, a notable Chinese patriot and hero

=== Historical ===
- Liu Yan, king of Nanhai and first emperor of the Southern Han dynasty
- Liang Daoming, king of Palembang during the Ming dynasty.
- Chow Ah Chi, a Toisan Cantonese was Sir Stamford Raffles' ship carpenter who was the first man to land on modern-day Singapore and led the way in posting the East India Company's flag on Singapore Island.
- Ching Shih, a female pirate leader brothel owner
- Ah Pak, pirate chieftain who defeated Portuguese pirates
- Liu Chang, the last emperor of the Southern Han dynasty
- Yuan Chonghuan, a Chinese general and hero from Ming dynasty who defeated and ward off the Manchu invasion

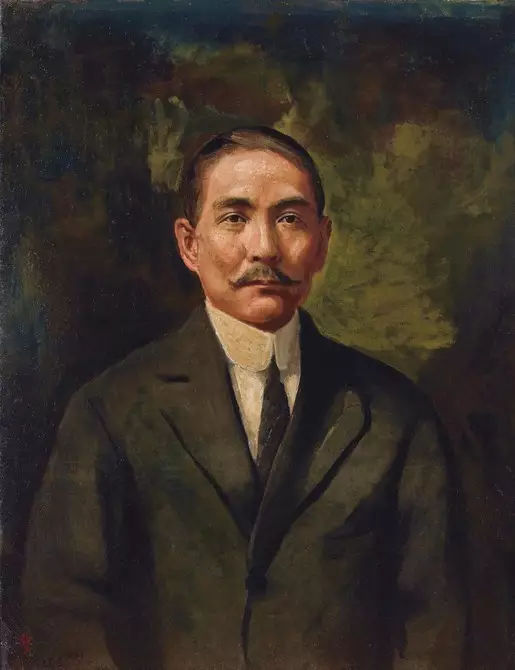
"Portrait of Sun Yat-sen" (1921) Li Tiefu

- Sun Yat-sen, born in Zhongshan, Guangdong; Chinese revolutionary and founder of the Republic of China
- Deng Shichang, admiral and one of the first modern naval officers in China in the late Qing dynasty
- Tse Tsan-tai, early Chinese revolutionary of the late Qing dynasty
- Kang Youwei was a Chinese scholar, noted calligrapher and prominent political thinker and reformer of the late Qing dynasty.
- Liang Qichao was a Chinese scholar, journalist, philosopher and reformist who lived during the Qing dynasty and Republic of China.
- Henry Lee Hau Shik, first Finance Minister of the Federation of Malaya and the only major leader of the independence movement not born in Malaya.
- Jiang Guangnai, general and statesman in the Republic of China and the People's Republic of China who successfully defended Shanghai City from the Japanese invasion in the 28 January Incident of 1932

=== Entertainers ===
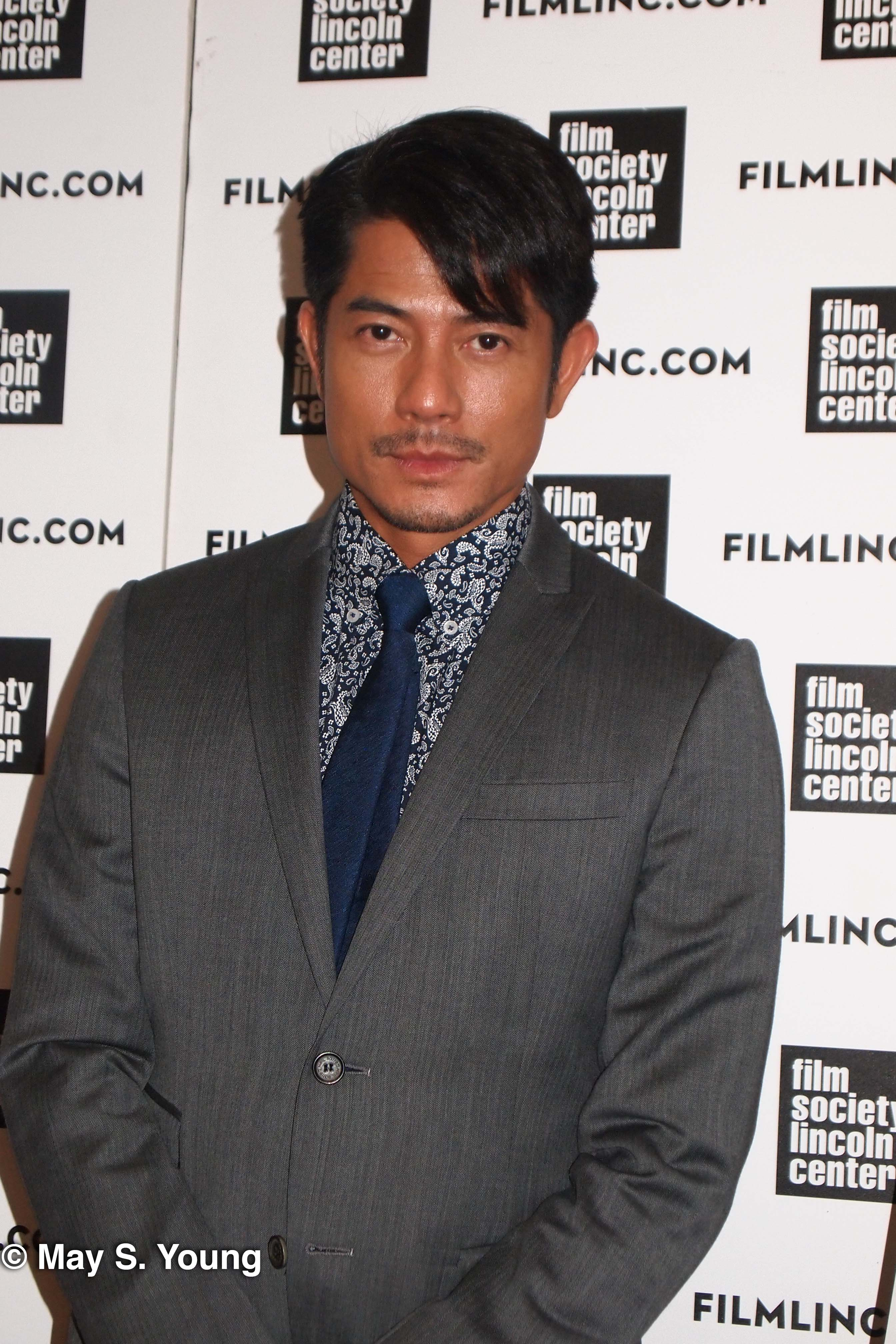
Aaron Kwok

- Anna May Wong, the first Chinese American and Asian female international movie star
- Anita Mui, Hong Kong musician, dubbed as the "Madonna of the East".
- Harry Shum Jr., actor
- James Wong Howe, leading Hollywood cinematographer in the 1930s–40s and ten-time Academy Award nominee
- Lai Man-Wai, the father of Hong Kong cinema
- Stephen Chow, His mother is Cantonese but his grandfather is from Ningbo. He is an actor and film director known for the comedy blockbusters Shaolin Soccer and Kung Fu Hustle.
- John Woo, influential film director
- Tony Leung Chiu-wai, award-winning actor known for his collaborations with Wong Kar-wai, including In The Mood For Love
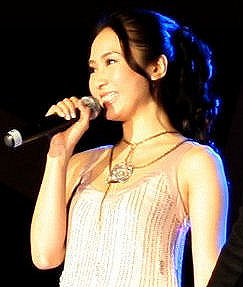
- Gigi Lai
  Andy Lau, one of Hong Kong's most commercially successful singers and actors since the mid-1980s
- Gigi Lai, actress and Cantopop singer
- Aaron Kwok, dancer and singer since the early 1990s
- Amy Kwok, actress and Miss Hong Kong 1991
- Rainie Yang, Taiwanese singer
- Danny Chan Pak-keung, Hong Kong singer
- Fish Leong, Malaysian Chinese singer
- Kris Wu, Canadian rapper and former member of K-pop boy band EXO.
- Jackson Wang, rapper and member of K-pop boy band GOT7.
- Tony Leung Ka-fai, Hong Kong actor
- Cheung Ka Fai, Hong Kong actor
- Leo Ku, Hong Kong singer
- Rui En, Singaporean actress
- Liang Wern Fook, one of the pioneer figures in Singaporean Chinese folk songs
- Yuen Woo-ping, renowned as one of the most successful and influential figures in the world of Hong Kong action cinema
- Sinn Sing Hoi, one of the earliest generation of Chinese composers
- Chris Cheong, an international mentalist and illusionist.
- Terence Cao, Singaporean actor
- Mark Chen, renowned Singaporean composer
- Kelly Poon, Singaporean singer
- Awkwafina, American rapper, comedian, television personality, television host
- Jeff Chan, Asian American tenor saxophonist and composer
- Zen Chong, Malaysian actor and won supporting acting in 2009
- Michael Paul Chan is an American film and television actor.
- Laura Ling, American journalist and writer. Correspondent and vice-president of its Vanguard Journalism Unit.
- Lisa Ling, American journalist, television presenter, special correspondent for The Oprah Winfrey Show
- Sam Tsui, American singer/songwriter and video producer. Internet celebrity with 2.8 million subscribers on YouTube.
- Wong brothers, three ethnic Chinese film directors, the pioneers of the Indonesian movie industry
- Lo Lieh, Hong Kong action star
- Lü Wencheng, master of Cantonese music and Guangdong folk music
- Warren Mok, an operatic tenor who has performed many leading roles since his European debut in 1987.
- Hung Sin Nui, Master of Chinese and Cantonese opera.
- Jeff Fatt, Australian musician and actor.
- Jessica Soho, Filipino news anchor, correspondent and TV host of Kapuso Mo, Jessica Soho who traces her paternal grandfather's ancestral roots at Hoiping County, Guangdong, China.

=== Politicians ===
- Tang Shaoyi, Prime Minister of the Republic of China
- Donald Tsang, Chief Executive of Hong Kong
- Edmund Ho Hau Wah, Chief Executive of Macau
- Fernando Chui, Chief Executive of Macau
- Wu Ting-fang, Chinese foreign minister
- Wen Tsungyao, Chinese politician and diplomat
- Kang Tongbi Chinese politician.
- Hiram Fong, the first Asian American and Chinese to be elected as Republican United States Senator and nominated for presidency of the United States
- John So, the first Lord Mayor of Melbourne to be directly elected by the people in 2006 and the first mayor of Asian descent
- Adrienne Clarkson, 26th Governor General of Canada, the first non-white Canadian to be appointed to the vice-regal position
- Norman Kwong, the 16th Lieutenant Governor of Alberta, Canada
- Gary Locke, first governor of a state in the Continental United States of Asian descent; the only Chinese American ever to serve as a governor
- Judy Chu, first Chinese American woman to be elected to the United States Congress
- Julius Chan, Prime Minister of Papua New Guinea from 1980 to 1982 and from 1994 to 1997
- Lee Siew Choh, politician and medical doctor. Singapore's first Non-Constituency Member of Parliament (NCMP)
- Tan Sri Datuk Amar Stephen Kalong Ningkan was the first Chief Minister of Sarawak.
- Víctor Joy Way was the Prime Minister of Peru from January 1999 until December 1999.
- José Antonio Chang Escobedo was the Prime Minister of Peru and second Chinese Peruvian Prime Minister, the first being Víctor Joy Way
- Peter Chin, lawyer and 56th Dunedin, New Zealand mayor
- Meng Foon, mayor of Gisborne, New Zealand
- Alan Lowe, architect, former mayor of Victoria, British Columbia, Canada
- Ida Chong, accountant, former municipal councillor of Saanich, British Columbia, former cabinet minister/Member of Legislative Assembly of British Columbia, Canada
- Chang Apana, inspirational detective with an influential law enforcement career
- Kin W. Moy American diplomat and the first ethnic Chinese to be director of the American Institute in Taiwan.
- Debra Wong Yang, first Asian American woman to serve as a United States Attorney.
- Chan Heng Chee, Singapore's Minister in Prime Minister's Office, Chief of Army from 2010 to 2011
- Chan Sek Keong, third Chief Justice of Singapore, Attorney-General of Singapore from 1992 to 2006
- Chan Kong Choy, Malaysian politician, deputy president and transport minister
- Cheryl Chan, member of the country's governing People's Action Party (PAP)
- Sitoh Yih Pin, Singapore politician member of Parliament (MP)
- Leong Yew Koh, first Governor of Malacca since independence.
- Cheong Yoke Choy, famous and well respected philanthropist during the British Malaya era.
- Edwin Tong, member of Parliament in Singapore representing the Marine Parade Group Representation Constituency.
- Eu Chooi Yip, prominent member of the anti-colonial and Communist movements in Malaya and Singapore
- Ho Peng Kee, Senior Minister of State in the Ministry of Law and the Ministry of Home Affairs
- Jek Yeun Thong, prominent first generation People's Action Party (PAP) politician in Singapore
- Hoo Ah Kay, leader with many high ranking posts in Singapore, honourable consul to China, Japan and Russia.
- Kan Ting Chiu, Senior Judge in the Supreme Court.
- Ho Yuen Hoe, Nun who received a Public Service Award from the President of Singapore
- Kin W. Moy, American diplomat. He is one of the first Chinese to hold an important position.
- Datuk Patinggi Tan Sri Dr. George Chan Hong Nam (陈康南), was the former Deputy Chief Minister of Sarawak.
- Fong Chan Onn, Malaysian politician and a former Minister of Human Resources
- Fong Po Kuan, Malaysian politician from the Democratic Action Party (DAP)
- Loke Siew Fook, Member of the Parliament of Malaysia
- Lui Tuck Yew, country's Minister for Transport and Second Minister for Defence, Singapore's Chief of Navy from 1999 to 2003
- António Ng Kuok Cheong is currently a member in the Macau Legislative Assembly and was the founding chairman of the New Democratic Macau Association.
- Anutin Charnvirakul is a Thai politician and engineer who has served as the 32nd prime minister of Thailand.

=== Athletes ===
- Chen Aisen, Chinese diver. He is a double gold medal winner at the 2016 Summer Olympics and a world champion.
- Larry Kwong, a Canadian ice hockey player who became the first person of colour to play in the NHL.
- Wong Peng Soon, a renowned male badminton player in the latter half of the 20th century
- Patrick Chan, a world champion Chinese Canadian male figure skater
- Michelle Kwan, Chinese American female figure skater and five-time world champion
- Yi Jianlian, a 7-foot-tall Chinese basketball player for NBA, Milwaukee Bucks, New Jersey Nets and Washington Wizards
- Guan Weizhen, female badminton player who won three consecutive women's doubles titles at the BWF World Championships
- Chen Xiaomin, Chinese retired weightlifter, in 2000 Sydney Olympics on the women's weightlifting gold medal, also a world and Asian champion
- Shanshan Feng, the first golfer from China to win LPGA major championship and major championship, she was ranked fifth in 2012 Women's World Golf Rankings.
- He Chong, Chinese diver. He is the 2008 Olympic Champion gold medalist in the 3m springboard. He was unbeaten from 2006 to 2016.
- Jiang Jialiang, table tennis player. He won medals in Asia and world table tennis tournaments.
- Xie Xingfang, badminton player, a two-time world champion women's singles.
- Chen Xiexia, won three golds at the 2007 World Weightlifting Championships. The first gold medal for China in the 2008 Summer Olympics.
- Zhang Jiewen, gold medal in Badminton 2004 Athens
- Lao Lishi, gold medal in women's 10 meter synchronised platform along with Li Ting.
- Su Bingtian, sprinter. He is the reigning Asian champion over 100 metres, was a semi-finalist at the 2012 Summer Olympics and a finalist at the 2015 World Championships.
- Liang Wenchong, highest ranked golfer from the People's Republic of China, the only Chinese golfer to have reached the top 100 of the Official World Golf Ranking.
- Zeng Qiliang, the first medal of Chinese male swimmer in world championships.
- Lindswell Kwok, six times world champion of Wushi
- Brian Ah Yat, former American football quarterback
- Harland Ah You, is a former gridiron football defensive lineman who played 10 games with the Calgary Stampeders of the Canadian Football League in 1998.
- Junior Ah You, Hall of Fame and Top 50 players of the league's modern era by Canadian sports network TSN.
- Keanu Asing, surfer who competes in the World Surf League and debuted on the World Championship Tour of the 2015 World Surf League.
- Soh Wooi Yik, Malaysian men's doubles player in badminton, first Malaysians to win BWF World Championships in 2022.
- Josiah Ng, the first Malaysian to make it into the cycling Olympic finals becoming a three-time Olympian
- Brian Fok, footballer
- Leung Ka Hai, footballer
- Zhi-Gin Lam
- Lee Lai Shan, windsurfer. She was the first athlete to win an Olympic medal representing Hong Kong at the 1996 Summer Olympics.

=== Business ===
- Raymond, Thomas and Walter Kwok, Brothers whose property business makes them the fourth richest in Hong Kong
- Stanley Ho, Hong Kong and Macanese business magnate
- Lui Che-woo, real estate and hospitality magnate, Hong Kong billionaire, once the 2nd richest man in Asia
- Cheng Yu-tung, Hong Kong billionaire
- Tang Yiu Hong Kong billionaire businessman, founder of shoe and sportswear retailer Belle International
- Mei Quong Tart, rich nineteenth-century merchant
- Charles Sew Hoy, merchant and gold-dredging pioneer
- Loke Yew, philanthropist and was once the richest man in British Malaysia
- Chin Gee Hee, merchant and railway entrepreneur
- Lee Shau-kee, Once the 4th richest man in world, real estate tycoon and owner of Henderson Land Development
- Steven Lo, businessman and football team manager
- He Jingtang, a prominent Chinese architect for Olympic 2008
- Jimmy Lai, founder of Giordano
- He Xiangjian is the co-founder of Midea, one of China's largest appliance makers.
- Yang Huiyan, the majority shareholder of Country Garden Holdings
- Lawrence Ho, Hong Kong businessman, chairman and CEO of Melco International, the chairman and CEO of Melco Crown Entertainment
- Dennis Fong, Fong is recognised by the Guinness Book of World Records as the first professional gamer.
- Peter Tham, former Singaporean stockbroker and the director of Pan-Electric Industries and now a wanted criminal.
- Loke Wan Tho, founder of Cathay Organisation in Singapore and Malaysia.
- Datuk Seri Panglima Dr Wong Kwok, founder of the Wong Kwok Group in Sabah, Malaysia.
- Eu Tong Sen, leading businessman in Malaya, Singapore and Hong Kong during the late 19th and early 20th century
- Ah Ken, Chinese American businessman and popular figure in Chinatown, Manhattan during the mid-to late 19th century.
- Kathy Chan, Chinese American entrepreneur and investor
- Wesley Chan, early product innovator at Google Inc., best known for founding and launching Google Analytics and Google Voice

=== Arts and Photography ===
- Chen Yongqiang, is a China as a national level A artist and vice-president of the Chinese Painting Society.
- Choy Weng Yang, contributions on post-modern arts in Singapore, helped shaped the contemporary art scene in Singapore
- Reagan Louie, an American photographer on sex life.
- Alan Chin, contributing photographer to Newsweek and The New York Times, editor and photographer at BagNews
- Bernice Bing, Chinese American lesbian artist involved in the San Francisco Bay Area art scene in the 1960s
- Lee Man Fong, A painter who had successful exhibitions in Europe and Asia.
- You Jin, received the Cultural Medallion Award in 2009 for her contributions to Singapore's literary arts scene.

=== Martial artists ===
- Ip Man, martial artist and teacher of Bruce Lee.
- Wong Fei-hung, martial artist in the Qing dynasty.
- Donnie Yen, martial artist and actor, one of Asia's highest paid action stars.
- Bruce Lee, one of the most influential martial artists and famous actors of Asian descent of all time.
- Chan Heung, founder of Choy Li Fut

=== Authors ===
- Francis Chan, American Christian teacher, preacher, author of the best-selling book Crazy Love: Overwhelmed by a Relentless God
- Clara Ng, Indonesian writer who is known for both adult fiction and children's literature.
- Amy Tan, Award-winning Chinese American author of The Joy Luck Club and other best-selling books
- Jeffery Paul Chan, American author and scholar

=== Academics ===
- Flossie Wong-Staal, a virologist and molecular biologist; the first scientist to clone HIV and determine the function of its genes in 1985. In 2007 The Daily Telegraph heralded Dr. Wong-Staal as #32 of the "Top 100 Living Geniuses".
- Chu Ching-wu, physicist and one of the first scientists to demonstrate high-temperature superconductivity, in 1987
- Choh Hao Li, Chinese American biochemist and first scientist to synthesise human growth hormone in 1970
- Tak Mak, Chinese Canadian immunologist and biochemist, discovered T-cell receptor.
- Wu Ta-You, the "father of Chinese physics"
- Wu Lien-teh, physician and Nobel prize nominee
- Vivian Wing-Wah Yam, chemist known for her work on light-emitting materials and solar energy
- Albert Chan, professor of chemistry and traditional Chinese medicine
- Liang Sili, rocket and missile control system scientist
- Nancy Ip – member of the Chinese Academy of Sciences and the World Academy of Sciences
- Albert Chan – a Hong Kong professor of chemistry and traditional Chinese medicine.
- Liang Sili – Chief Designer of inertial guidance platforms for Chinese ballistic missiles.
- Li Shaozhen – improved cataract surgery quality in the introduction of technology and innovation

=== Mathematicians ===
- Yum-Tong Siu – the William Elwood Byerly Professor of Mathematics at Harvard University

=== Religious ===
- Firdaus Wong Wai Hung - Malaysian Islamic preacher

=== Other notable figures ===
- Feng Joe Guey, Chinese aviation pioneer
- Liang Sicheng, the "father of modern Chinese architecture"
- Dai Ailian, the "mother of Chinese modern dance"
- Lee Ya-Ching, pioneering aviator and actress
- Chang Apana, a famous detective who influenced many fictional works
- Ye Xiaogang, China's most active and most famous composers of contemporary classical music
- Tunku Azizah Aminah Maimunah Iskandariah

== See also ==
- Cantonese culture
- Cantonese
- Chinese people
- Taishanese
- Hoklo people
