= Alan Chin =

Alan Chin may refer to:

- Alan Chin (artist) (born 1987), contemporary American artist
- Alan Chin (photographer) (fl. 1996–2008), American photo-journalist
