= Belle International =

Chinese women's shoe retailer

Belle International Holdings Limited
- Native name: 百丽国际控股有限公司
- Type: Public
- Traded as: SEHK: 1880
- Industry: Footwear
- Founded: 1991; 35 years ago
- Founder: Yiu Tang
- Headquarters: Shenzhen, China
- Area served: People's Republic of China
- Key people: Deng Yao (chairman); Baijiao Sheng (CEO)
- Products: Shoes
- Revenue: US$1.5 billion (2009)
- Number of employees: 71,789 (2009)
- Website: Belle International Holdings Limited

Belle International Holdings Limited is a women's shoe retailer in China, with 22% of the domestic market share. It is engaged in the manufacturing, distribution, and retail sales of footwear products. As of its IPO in May 2007, the company had 3,828 retail outlets in 150 cities in China and 35 in Hong Kong, Macau and the US.

== History ==
Belle's founder and chairman, Tang Yiu, started Lai Wah Footwear Trading Ltd. in 1981 in Hong Kong. He started Belle International in 1991 as a shoe wholesale manufacturer, and the company expanded into retail in 2004. It attracted private equity investors including Morgan Stanley and domestic Chinese private equity manager CDH. In May 2007 Belle raised $1.1 billion in an IPO on the Hong Kong Stock Exchange. The offering was priced at the top of the range, at 31 times its estimated 2007 earnings, after retail investors ordered more than 500 times the shares initially earmarked for them. According to the IPO prospectus, an investment company linked to Groupe Arnault, parent of French luxury goods group LVMH, purchased $30 million worth of shares as a strategic corporate investor. Belle raised an additional $775 million in two secondary listings in November 2007 and April 2008, which it used to buy several competing brands.

In 2006, Belle International won the contract to be the biggest distributor of Nike and Adidas. As of 2014, these brands made up 90% of the sales in Belle's sportswear division. In addition, Belle International sells the brands Puma, Converse, Reebok, Vans, Bata, Mizuno, Clarks, Mephisto, among others, which account for 5.3% of total sales.

In 2007, Belle reported profits of $291 million (up 102% over 2006) on sales of $1.7 billion (up 89% over 2006). Its three women's brands - Staccato, Millie's, and Joy&Peace - account for about a 50% share of the $90-$150 shoe segment in China. Non-sports shoes account for 67% of sales, and licensing agreements with global brands make up the remainder.

In September 2008, Belle was named No. 8 in the BusinessWeek Asia 50, Businessweek's annual ranking of top Asian companies. In 2009, Belle sold its shares in Fila China to ANTA Sports, which Fila China was its subsidiary (owned 85%).

Sportswear distribution represented 39% of the company's sales in 2014.

In 2017, Hillhouse Capital and CDH Investments privatized Belle International in a deal worth $6.8 billion. The company spun off its sportswear division with an initial public offering in October 2019, raising $1.01 billion.
