= Luo Sen =

Luo Sen (Chinese: 羅森; pinyin: Luó Sēn; Jyutping: Lo^{4} Sam^{1} 1821-1899) was a Chinese interpreter who accompanied Matthew Perry on his second visit to Japan in 1854. He wrote the “Diary of Japan” about his experiences in Japan and introduced Japan at the end of the Edo period to Qing China and the United States.

== Biography ==
Luo was born in Guangdong. It is said that he was well educated enough to pass the Imperial examination, but his early life and his status before accompanying Perry are not well known. Perry's official interpreter, Samuel Wells Williams, hired Luo in Hong Kong during Perry's second visit to Japan.

Luo was fluent in English and familiar with Chinese literature and poetry, but he could not speak Japanese at all. On the other hand, officials of the Tokugawa shogunate could not speak English, but they could write Chinese texts through reading the Four Books and Five Classics. Therefore, Luo played an active role as a written interpreter during the negotiations for the Japan–US Treaty of Peace and Amity. This treaty had a Chinese-language version.

Perry's party called at Ryukyu, Yokohama, Shimoda, and Hakodate. During this time, Luo had exchange with Hayashi Akira, Hirayama Seisai, Tatsunosuke Hori, Isaburo Gohara, Yoshida Shōin, Bankei Otsuki, Ranryo Seki and others. After returning to Hong Kong, Luo published his observations of Ryukyu and Japan in Chinese as “Diary of Japan” in November 1854 in the monthly magazine Chinese Serial. The English translation was included in the official document of the U.S. Congress, “Chronicle of the Japanese Expedition of Perry's Fleet” (1856–1857), in which Luo's name was withheld and he was referred to as “a native of China”.

Yoshida Shōin translated “Manshin Kiji” (also known as “Nanjing Kiji”), written by Luo about the situation in Qing China including the Taiping Rebellion after the Opium War, with annotations as “Shinkoku Kampo Ran-ki,” and influenced the people's thought at the end of the Edo period.
