= Albert Sun-Chi Chan =

Hong Kong chemist

Albert Sun-Chi Chan (Chinese: 陳新滋; Jyutping: can4 san1 zi1; pinyin: Chén Xīnzī; born 30 October 1950) is a Hong Kong chemist. He is a professor of chemistry and traditional Chinese medicine. He has served as a vice-president of the Hong Kong Polytechnic University (PolyU) and the president of Hong Kong Baptist University (HKBU).

== Career ==
Chan began his professional career in chemistry in 1979 at Monsanto in the United States. He moved back to Asia in 1992 to serve as a visiting expert at National Taiwan University, and then returned to Hong Kong in 1994 to take up the position of chairman of PolyU's Department of Applied Biology and Chemical Engineering. While teaching at PolyU, he also pursued academic interests in mainland China, becoming the first dean of Sun Yat-sen University's School of Pharmaceutical Sciences and later the first director of the State Key Laboratory of Medicine and Molecular Pharmacology in Shenzhen. He was named a fellow of the Chinese Academy of Sciences in 2001. He held his PolyU departmental chairmanship until 2007, when he became the dean of the university's Faculty of Applied Science and Textiles and the vice-president for Research and Development.

In 2009, Chan was named as the president of Hong Kong Baptist University for a five-year term to begin in July 2010. His selection as university president drew criticisms from faculty and students for the opacity of the selection process. Search committee chairman Wilfred Wong Ying-wai stated that Chan was clearly the best candidate among the six who had been short-listed, and defended the committee's decision not to involve students in the selection process. Chan's goals for his term as president included improving HKBU to become one of the world's top 200 universities and developing the university's traditional Chinese medicine research capabilities. In 2013, he became involved in a high-profile dispute with the Town Planning Board over the zoning of land near the university; HKBU had made plans as early as 2009 to use the land to build a traditional Chinese medicine teaching hospital, while the government hoped to sell the land to real estate developers to build high-end flats. Chan threatened to resign from his post to protest the government's decision.

== Personal life ==
Chan was born in Taishan, Guangdong. He moved to Hong Kong at the age of 14, where he worked hard at memorising English vocabulary in order to catch up with other students and eventually achieved excellent academic results, earning him a scholarship to pursue higher education in Japan. There, he enrolled in International Christian University in Tokyo, where he earned a B.S. in chemistry in 1975. He then went on to the University of Chicago, where he defended a doctoral thesis on asymmetric hydrogenation in 1979.

While living in the US, he naturalised as a citizen; he later renounced U.S. citizenship in 2001 after being named an academician of the Chinese Academy of Sciences. He was named a Justice of the Peace of Hong Kong on 30 June 2012.

== Selected works ==
- Chan, Albert Sun-Chi (1979). Mechanistic aspects of homogeneous catalytic asymmetric hydrogenation. Doctoral dissertation. University of Chicago, Department of Chemistry. OCLC 28785606.
- Lin, Guo-Qiang; Li, Yue-Ming; Chan, Albert Sun-Chi (2001). Principles and applications of asymmetric synthesis. New York: John Wiley & Sons. ISBN 9780471400271.
- Chan, Albert Sun-Chi (2006). Asymmetric catalysis. Amsterdam: Elsevier. OCLC 633253792.
