= Jeff Chan (saxophonist) =

American saxophonist and composer

- Birth name: Jeffrey Chan
- Born: November 23, 1970 (age 54); Concord, California, U.S.
- Genres: Free jazz, free improvisation
- Occupation(s): Musician, composer
- Instrument(s): Tenor sax, soprano sax, bass clarinet, flute
- Years active: 1990s–present
- Labels: AIR

Jeffrey Chan (born November 23, 1970) is an American saxophonist and composer.

== Early life ==
Chan was born in Concord, California on November 23, 1970, and grew up in the San Francisco Bay Area. He has Chinese heritage.

== Later life and career ==
Chan made his recording debut as leader in 1997, making Winds Shifting for Asian Improv Records (AIR). Over the next few years he worked in a variety of musical settings, including with the large group named the Big Fun Philharmonic. Chan moved to Chicago in 2002, where he studied with the saxophonist Jimmy Ellis and worked with Asian American musicians. In Chicago, his second release on AIR, came from that year.

Chan is a participant in the Asian-American Creative Music Movement, which has ties with the Association for the Advancement of Creative Musicians (AACM) and is also based in Chicago. He has composed for solo performance and large ensembles. Examples of the latter appeared on his 2009 album Horns of Plenty, which was also released by AIR. As a performer, his main instruments are the tenor and soprano saxophones, but he also plays bass clarinet and flute.

== Influences and style ==
Chan's "work evinces an awareness of the Asian American experience, embracing non-Western cultures and traditions while engaging with the central tenets of collective jazz improvisation." His "improvisational language takes root in the expansive structural and harmonic approach of Dewey Redman and Ornette Coleman. He favors a flexible sense of pulse, a robust and hearty tenor saxophone sound, and a strong sense of collective organicism in his overall musical concept." Other influences include musicians linked to the AACM.

== Discography ==
- Winds Shifting (1997, AIR)
- Color Architecture (1999)
- In Chicago (2002, AIR)
- Horns of Plenty (2009, AIR)
