= Ningpo massacre =

Massacre of Portuguese pirates in Ningbo

The Ningpo Massacre
Date	26 June 1857
Location	Ningpo city, China
Result	Chinese victory

Belligerents
Chinese Pirates	Portuguese Pirates

Commanders and leaders
Ah Pak	

Casualties and losses
2 Chinese; 1 English dead	40 Portuguese dead

The Ningpo Massacre was a massacre of Portuguese pirates by Cantonese pirates led by Ah Pak about Ningpo city. In the 19th century, the Ningpo city authorities contracted Cantonese pirates to eliminate by extermination Portuguese pirates who raided Cantonese shipping around Ningbo. The campaign was "successful", with only two Chinese Cantonese and 40 Portuguese were killed, being dubbed "The Ningpo Massacre" by an English correspondent, who noted that the Portuguese pirates had behaved savagely towards the Cantonese Chinese, and that the Portuguese authorities at Macau should have reined in the pirates.

== Battle and Massacre ==
Portuguese pirates who raided Cantonese shipping in the early 19th century were eliminated by Cantonese forces around Ningbo.

The people from Ningbo supported the Cantonese massacre of the Portuguese pirates and the attack on the Portuguese consul. The Ningbo authorities had made an agreement with a Cantonese pirate named A'Pak to exterminate the Portuguese pirates. The Portuguese did not even try to fight when the Cantonese pirates sacked their consulate, fleeing and hiding among the tombs. The Cantonese butchered around 40 Portuguese while sacking the consulate. Only two Chinese and one Englishman who sided with the Cantonese died.
