= Ah Ken =

American businessman

- Born: fl. 1858; Canton, China
- Died: 1896; Chinatown, Manhattan, New York City
- Other names: Ah Kam
- Occupations: businessman, boarding house operator
- Known for: Being first Chinese American to settle in Chinatown, New York City.

Ah Ken (fl. 1858–1896), also known as Ah Kam, was a well-known Chinese American businessman in Chinatown, Manhattan (曼哈頓華埠) during the mid-to late 19th century. The first Asian man to permanently immigrate to Chinatown, although Quimbo Appo is claimed to have arrived in the area during the 1840s, Ah Ken resided on Mott Street and eventually founded a successful cigar store on Park Row.

== Cigar business mogul ==
He first arrived in New York around 1858 where he was "probably one of those Chinese mentioned in gossip of the sixties as peddling 'awful' cigars at three cents apiece from little stands along the City Hall park fence - offering a paper spill and a tiny oil lamp as a lighter" according to author Alvin Harlow in Old Bowery Days: The Chronicles of a Famous Street (1931).

Later immigrants would similarly find work as "cigar men" or carrying billboards and Ah Ken's particular success encouraged cigar makers William Longford, John Occoo and John Ava to also ply their trade in Chinatown eventually forming a monopoly on the cigar trade. It has been speculated that it may have been Ah Ken who kept a small boarding house on lower Mott Street and rented out bunks to the first Chinese immigrants to arrive in Chinatown. It was with the profits he earned as a landlord, earning an average of $100 a month, that he was able to open his Park Row smoke shop around which modern-day Chinatown would grow.
