= Tang Yiu =

Tang Yiu (Chinese: 鄧耀; pinyin: Dèng Yào) is a Hong Kong billionaire businessman, the founder of shoe and sportswear retailer Belle International.

He is Chairman of the Federation of Hong Kong Footwear Ltd and honorary president of the Sam Shui Natives Association. Tang was a member of the Chinese People's Political Consultative Conference in Sanshui District of Foshan, China (2005 to 2012), as well as the China Trade Advisory Committee of Hong Kong Trade Development Council (2007 to 2011).

Teenmix and Staccato are among the brands that help Belle maintain its position as China's largest women's footwear retailer and distributor.

== Net worth ==
In May 2015, his net worth was estimated at US$ 3.5 billion.

As of December 2021, the net worth was US$ 2.2 billion.
