= Lee Man Fong =

Chinese artist (1913–1988)

Lee Man Fong (Chinese: 李曼峯; pinyin: Lǐmǐnfēng; Jyutping: lei5 man5 fung1; November 14, 1913 – April 3, 1988) was a painter born in Guangzhou, China. His father, a merchant with ten children, brought him to Singapore. When his father died in 1930, Lee had to work hard to earn a living for his mother and siblings using his skill in painting ads and artwork. However, that was not enough for him. In 1932, he moved to Jakarta, Indonesia. The tension between nationalist groups such as the Indonesian Painters Association (Persatuan Ahli-ahli Gambar Indonesia) and Indische-Holland kunstkring community stimulated him. In 1942, Lee was jailed because of his opposition to Japanese colonialism in Indonesia. After six months in jail, Takahashi Masao helped him gain freedom. This Japanese officer was interested in his artistic potential.

In 1946, President Sukarno heard about him when he had his solo exhibition in Jakarta. Sukarno then knew that Lee was given a Malino scholarship from Van Mook, the Netherlands lieutenant-governor general. In Europe, many of his exhibitions were successful. He briefly returned to Indonesia, and went back to hold exhibitions from The Hague to Paris. In 1952 he returned to Jakarta. The visit from Sukarno and Basuki Abdullah, the official palace painter at that time, encouraged him to establish Yin Hua in 1955. Yin Hua was an organization of Chinese painters that had its office on Lokasari Street, Jakarta. Many art exhibitions were organised by Yin Hua. In 1956, Yin Hua was invited to hold exhibitions in China.

The relationship between Sukarno and Lee improved. His beautiful and perfect works matched with Sukarno's taste. For him, Lee's art was an escape from revolutionary spirit. Sukarno didn't have any particular theme preference in art. Only ten percent of all his collections had a nationalist theme. "A thing of beauty is a joy forever," was his remark about his taste on art. Therefore, when Basuki Abdullah suggested to him to appoint Lee as the next presidential painter, Sukarno agreed to it without hesitance.

Source: Kompas, June 1, 2001, an article by Agus Dermawan T.

"Style should not be casually borrowed from others. Even worse is the deliberate imitation of the style created by another artist. Those who pretend that another artist's style is his own have no shame. For any style to hold up, the artist - its true creator - has had to toil ceaselessly for years with repeated experimentation and reflection out of which the results in turn are subjected to successive reevaluations and corrections. "

- Lee Man Fong, The Oil Paintings of Lee Man Fong: The Pioneer Artist of Indonesia and Singapore, Art Book Co., Ltd, p. 11 ISBN 9789576723841
