= Reagan Louie =

American artist, including photographer (born 1951)

- Born: 1951 (age 74–75); San Francisco, California, U.S.
- Education: University of California, Los Angeles; Yale University (MFA)
- Occupations: Academic, artist (including photographer)

Reagan Louie (born 1951) is an American academic and artist, including photographer.

His work focuses on cross-cultural identity and social transformation, particularly in Asia and among Asian communities in the United States. He is known for his photographic series Toward a Truer Life: Photographs of China 1980–1990 and Orientalia: Sex in Asia, which document cultural and societal changes in the regions he explored.

== Early life and work ==
Born in San Francisco, Louie was raised in a tight-knit Chinese-American community, speaking Cantonese as his primary language until attending public school.

His father was born in a Toisanese village in Guangdong, China, and left at age nine, while his mother was a third-generation Chinese immigrant.

In Louie's first year of college, an art class sparked his interest in the arts.

Louie has cited his experience entering school and the process of assimilation as a significant influence on his work. In the foreword of his book Toward a Truer Life, Louie wrote about the contradictory nature of his education and assimilation: “…if my education furthered some inner division, it also gave me the means to give voice to it.”

He studied painting at the University of California, Los Angeles, until he began working with Robert Heinecken, who introduced him to photography. He earned a Master of Fine Arts degree at Yale University, where he studied with Walker Evans.

== Career ==
=== Early career ===
His first photography projects during the 1970s explored changing Asian communities in California; Chinatown, San Francisco; Sacramento Chinese families; and the Japanese truck farms and shops around Sawtelle Boulevard in Los Angeles. In these immigrant communities, Louie recognized manifestations of his struggle with his conflicted cultural experience. During this period, Louie began working exclusively in color using a documentary style.

=== Toward a Truer Life ===
In 1980, Louie went to China for the first time. During his travels there, he exposed more than three hundred rolls of film, from which he kept two pictures. In the forward to his book Toward a Truer Life, Louie says he felt that he had to abandon preconceived notions to see China and understand his cultural heritage, clichés, bias, and convention. Over the next ten years, Louie made repeated trips back to China to document the change happening in the country during its modernization.

The photographs depict a wide range of subjects, from Maoist China's last days to the 1989 Tiananmen Square protests and massacre. Louie focused on everyday life to show the multi-faceted impact of modern China's transformation on its citizens and its environment.

Peter Hales, in his review for The New York Times Book Review, writes, "Toward a Truer Life is arguably the best photography book of the year. A decade of deep seeing gave him a collection of grave, perfect color photographs, pictures that far exceed the local circumstances of their making or Mr. Louie's quest for a past.”

=== Other work ===
In the 1990s, Louie worked on two projects. With the support of the Lange-Taylor Prize awarded by Duke University, he and the writer Tom Farber produced work about the South Pacific. And through the Indivisible project, commissioned by the Center for Creative Photography and the Center for Documentary Studies at Duke University, Louie photographed a community and an art project in North Philadelphia.

During the 2000s, Louie was a contributing photographer for California Magazine, where he produced several photographic essays, whose subjects ranged from Chinese Americans in California to farm life in the Sacramento delta.

In 1997, Louie returned to Asia on a Fulbright fellowship to study the history of Chinese photography. He was among the several photographers who covered the 1997 handover of Hong Kong back to China for The New York Times.

=== Orientalia and controversy ===
Orientalia was a six-year exploration of the world of Asian sex work. According to Louie, Orientalia was a continuation of his journey to understand Asia and to evolve an integrated self. "As I began to photograph in Asia, I also discovered that my ethnicity was not the only filter I was perceived through or shaped by. I experienced an unfamiliar dynamic between men and women." Growing up in America as an Asian male, he felt both exoticized and emasculated. In Asia, with its inherent male dominance, he experienced more traditional gendered roles.

Louie chose to explore these dynamics in the Asian sex industry, where the relationships between women and men were visible and dramatically heightened. To represent the diversity of cultures, classes, and economics, Louie photographed in China, Taiwan, Hong Kong, Thailand, Burma, the Philippines, Vietnam, Cambodia, Japan, South Korea, and Tibet. Above all, Louie sought to represent, without preconceptions, the complexity of sex workers' lives.

Orientalia sparked controversy and debate. For many, the non-judgmental position of the work was problematic. Critic Glen Helfand, in his Salon review, wrote: “Such images raise lots of difficult questions. Are the women being demeaned or empowered? Are they exoticized or exploited? The ambivalence is much of what makes these pictures interesting…” But sex activist Carol Leigh of COYOTE (Call Off Your Old Tired Ethics), a sex workers' rights organization, observed, "I was very moved by the show. The photographs showed these women as individuals, as people. I liked that there was no explanation and no condemnation."

=== New work ===
At the same time he was creating Orientalia, Louie also began a series entitled Asia at the Edge, a study of changes throughout major Asian countries, including North Korea. This project also brought him back to China. He saw China as a completely different society than it was in the 1980s, particularly the new millennial generation.

Louie began three projects. Let a Hundred Flowers Blossom depicts the effects of the country’s transformation over three decades through portraits of Chinese citizens. Before and After compares people and places Louie photographed across a range of time, from thirty years prior to only months before, to show the speed and scale of the country's changes. In APEC Blue, he juxtaposes events such as the 2008 Beijing Olympics and the 2010 Shanghai Expo with quotidian life.

== Personal life ==
Louie was a professor at the San Francisco Art Institute and has taught and lectured widely. In 2014, he taught at The Three Shadows Photography Centre in Beijing and lectured at the China Academy of Art in Hangzhou. He lives and works in the San Francisco Bay Area.

== Selected exhibitions ==
Louie's photographs have been featured in numerous solo and group shows, including the San Francisco Museum of Modern Art, the Southeast Museum of Photography, the Ansel Adams Center, the Chinese Culture Center, the 7th Gwangju Biennale, The Darkside at Fotomuseum Winterthur, Indivisible at the Philadelphia Museum of Art, China at the Hong Kong Art Centre, Capturing Light at the Oakland Museum, and New Photography 4 at the Museum of Modern Art.

== Selected public collections ==
Louie's works are in museum collections including the Metropolitan Museum of Art, the Museum of Modern Art, the San Francisco Museum of Modern Art, and the Los Angeles County Museum of Art.

== Selected publications ==
Louie's publications are listed below in chronological order:

- 2003: Orientalia: Sex in Asia, PowerHouse Books, NY. ISBN 1-57687-186-X.
- 1995: Worlds in Collision: Dialogues on Multicultural Art Issues, (co-editor with Carlos Villa), San Francisco Art Institute/International. ISBN 1883255465.
- 1991: Toward a Truer Life: Photographs of China 1980–1990, Aperture, New York. ISBN 0-89381-465-2.

Collections:

- 2015: Changjiang International Photography and Video Biennale catalog, Chongqing, China.
- 2013: Arts for the City, Heyday Press, San Francisco. ISBN 1597142069.
- 2009: Beyond Beauty, Duke University Press, Durham, NC.
- 2008: Darkside I, Fotomuseum Winterthur/Steidl, Zurich, Switzerland. ISBN 9783865217165.
- 2008: 7th Gwangju Biennale catalogue, Korea
- 2005: 2nd Photo-Triennale catalogue, Seoul, Korea
- 2001: Capturing Light: Masterpieces of California Photography, 1850 to the Present, Norton, New York. ISBN 0393049930.
- 2000: Indivisible, Local Heroes: Changing America, Norton, NY. ISBN 0393050289.
- 1999: China: Fifty Years Inside the People’s Republic, Aperture, NY. ISBN 0893818623.
- 1998: Hope Photographs, Thames & Hudson, NY. ISBN 0500542287.
- 1987: One Journey to China, Aperture, spring issue 105.
