= Liang Sili =

Chinese aerospace engineer (1924–2016)

- 梁思礼
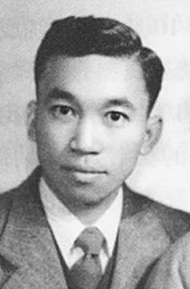
- Liang in 1956
- Born: Liang Sili; 24 August 1924; Beijing, Republic of China
- Died: 14 April 2016 (aged 91); Beijing, China
- Spouse: Mai Xiuqiong (m. 1956)
- Children: 3
- Father: Liang Qichao
- Scientific career
- Education: Purdue University (BS); University of Cincinnati (PhD)
- Known for: Dongfeng 2A; Dongfeng 5 Long March 2 Long March 3
- Fields: Aerospace engineering
- Workplaces: International Academy of Astronautics; Chinese Academy of Sciences; International Astronautical Federation

Liang Sili (simplified Chinese: 梁思礼; traditional Chinese: 梁思禮; 24 August 1924 – 14 April 2016) was a Chinese aerospace engineer. He was elected an academician of the International Academy of Astronautics in 1987 and the Chinese Academy of Sciences in 1993. He became the vice-president of the International Astronautical Federation in 1994.

Liang was the youngest son of Chinese scholar and reformist Liang Qichao. His elder brothers, Liang Sicheng and Liang Siyong, were also academicians.

== Education ==
Liang started his undergraduate studies at Carleton College in the United States in 1941. He transferred to Purdue University in 1943 and graduated from there with a bachelor's degree with a major in electrical engineering in 1945. He received a doctor of philosophy in missile control from the University of Cincinnati in 1949.

== Career ==
Liang returned to China in late 1949 when the Chinese Communist Party took control of mainland China. He was appointed jobs at the Institute of Telecommunications Technology (Ministry of Posts & Telecommunications) and later the Institute of Electronic Science (Communication Department of PLA). In 1956, Liang transferred to the Fifth Institute of Ministry of Defense. He became the deputy director of the Research Office of Missile Control Systems, working under Qian Xuesen. Liang played an important role in the design of the Dongfeng 2A missile, the Dongfeng 5 missile, the Long March 2 rocket, and the Long March 3 rocket.

Liang died on 14 April 2016, at the age of 91, in Beijing.
