= Wesley Chan =

American investor, innovator (b. 1978)

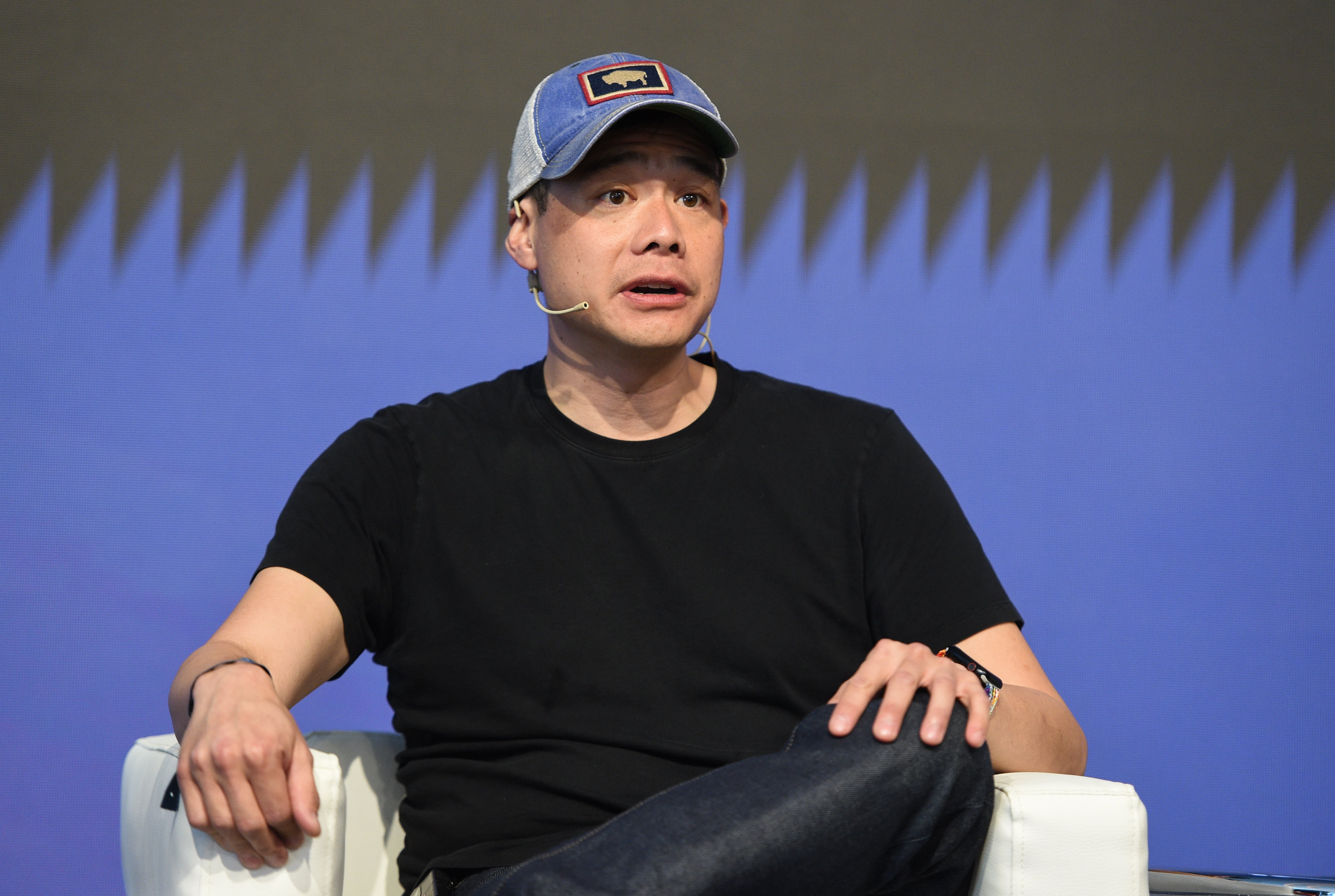
Chan in 2021

Wesley Chan (Wesley Tien-Houi, born 1978) is an American venture capitalist and the co-founder and managing partner of venture capital firm FPV. A graduate in computer science from the Massachusetts Institute of Technology, Chan first became known from his work in the early days of Google, founding Google Analytics and Google Voice, and for building Google's early advertising system.

While at Google, Chan developed an expertise as a venture capitalist, serving as a founding General Partner of Google Ventures, before moving to Felicis Ventures in 2014, then co-founding his own firm, FPV, in 2022. Through his first decade in venture capital, he gained attention as an early investor in many well known biotech, technology, and software startups, including Canva, Flexport, Guild Education, RobinHood, AngelList, Plaid, and Ring.

== Early life and education ==
Chan studied at the MIT Electrical Engineering and Computer Science Department, earning his B.S. and S.M. (2001) degrees. While earning his masters, he did his graduate research at the MIT Media Lab.

== Career ==
After completing his graduate studies in mid 2001, Chan started his career as a software engineer at Microsoft, moving to Fujitsu, moving to HP Labs by September 2001, where he was a research lead.

By early 2002, Chan had moved to Google at a time when, in his words: "dogs were still running around the office and nobody knew who we were". During his first eight years at Google, he helped to build, lead or launch a number of important business lines, including:

- Google Analytics, which Chan founded and launched.
- Google Toolbar where he led the design of Google's popup ads blocker and helped oversee the client team that eventually led to the development of Google Chrome.
- The acquisition of GrandCentral Communications in 2007, and Gizmo5 in 2009, two Voice over IP services (and their teams) that combined to became Google Voice and Google Hangouts.
- Google AdWords and Google AdSense, including building Google's first display advertising serving system, for which Chan holds 17 (of his 22 total) US patents.
- Google Talk and Google Hangouts
- Google WiFi

In 2009, still at Google, Chan moved into the field of venture capital, as one of the founding General Partners at Google Ventures. He led investments in and sat on the Board of Directors of software and enterprise startups, and biotech firms, including Gusto, Plaid, RobinHood, Vungle (exited to BlackStone), AngelList, iPierian (exited to Bristol Myers-Squibb), Dialpad, The Climate Corporation (exited to Monsanto), Parse (exited to Facebook), and Optimizely.

In January 2014, Chan stepped down as a General Partner and became an entrepreneur-in-residence (EIR), allowing him to examine the possibility of starting his own venture capital firm. In December 2014, he moved to Felicis Ventures, becoming a Managing Director and co-managing that fund with Aydin Senkut, whom he met when they were both early employees at Google. While at Felicis, Wesley invested in and sat on the board of directors of several "unicorn" startups, including Canva, Guild Education, and Culture Amp. He also led investments in Gusto, Flexport, Ring (exited to Amazon.com), Orca Bio, Astranis, and HyperScience.

From 2017 to 2019, Chan served as an Industrial Advisor to private equity firm EQT AB, and was a member of the Board of Directors for FocusVision, Inc., which EQT held a position in.

In January 2022, Chan left Felicis to co-found his own venture firm FPV with Pegah Ebrahimi, former COO of Morgan Stanley. The firm invests in early-stage life sciences and technology startups. Chan met Ebrahimi while students at MIT and were in the same dorm together. The firm raised $450M in its debut fund primarily from investors which were mission-driven charities, universities, and foundations, including the Wallace Foundation.

== Awards and recognition ==
Chan holds 17 US patents from his work building Google's early advertising system.

In 2010, Chan received a Google Founders' Award for his work on building the Google Toolbar and growing it into one of the most installed client products in the world. That same year, MIT Technology Review magazine named Chan as one of the top 35 Innovators Under 35, for his work on founding Google Voice and Google Analytics.

Chan's story as an early product founder at Google is featured in Steven Levy's 2011 book In the Plex.

In 2021, the not-for profit organization Gold House selected Chan as one of the 100 Most Impactful Asians of the Year. That same year, and again in 2022, Business Insider named Chan as one of the top 100 Seed Investors.

== Other interests and positions ==
While at MIT, Chan was an opinion writer and on the editorial staff at The Tech. He was also the Chief Photographer Emeritus for Google.

== Personal life ==
Chan is a supporter of the arts, and sits on the board of the Metropolitan Opera in New York City.

As of 2022, Chan is a resident of Jackson Hole, Wyoming, where he is well-known for his articulation of the area's scenic beauty and "cowboy self-reliance", according to a profile from The Information.
