= Kathy Chan =

American entrepreneur and investor

Kathy Chan (陳凱英)
- Born: New York City, USA
- Occupations: Entrepreneur, Venture Capital

Kathy Chan (陳凱英) is an American entrepreneur and investor. From 2007 to 2010, Chan worked at Facebook, where she focused on corporate communications and marketing. In 2010, she co-founded investment firm: 137 Ventures. In August 2014, she became an operating partner at Khosla Ventures.

Earlier in her career, Chan was involved in U.S. politics. During the 2006 election cycle, she served as deputy campaign manager and interim political committee director for Senator Bob Casey Jr. Previously, she was the director of operations for John Kerry’s 2004 presidential campaign in Pennsylvania.

Chan serve as a senior advisor to South by Southwest (SXSW) in 2009.
