= Alan Chin (photographer) =

American photographer

- Born: New York City, U.S.
- Occupations: Photographer; professor; writer

Alan Chin is an American photographer, professor, and writer. Since 1996, he has worked in China, the former Yugoslavia, Afghanistan, Iraq, Central Asia, and more recently in Egypt and Tunisia as a freelance photojournalist. Domestically, Chin followed the historic trail of the Civil Rights Movement, documented the aftermath of Hurricane Katrina, and covered the 2008 United States presidential election. Chin's career as a photojournalist began when he photographed the Tiananmen Square crackdown that began the night of June 3, 1989.

Chin is a contributing photographer to Newsweek and The New York Times, editor and photographer at BagNews, and the Managing Director of Facing Change: Documenting America (FCDA). He is also an adjunct professor for photojournalism at the Columbia University Graduate School of Journalism. Chin is currently writing and photographing a book on his ancestral region of Taishan and is a founding partner of Red Hook Editions.

Chin's work in Kosovo earned him a nomination for the Pulitzer Prize in 1999 and 2000. He has also won the 2017 Knight Foundation Detroit Arts Challenge. His work can be found in the collections of the Museum of Modern Art and the Detroit Institute of Arts.

Chin was born and raised in New York City's Chinatown.
