= Birla Institute of Technology and Science, Pilani – Dubai Campus =

Private university in Dubai, United Arab Emirates

- Motto: Gyanam paramam balam
- Motto in English: Knowledge is Supreme Power
- Type: Private; Deemed University
- Established: 2000; 26 years ago
- Affiliations: KHDA, DIAC, ACU, UGC, NAAC, PCI, AIU
- Chancellor: Kumar Mangalam Birla
- Vice-Chancellor: V. Ramgopal Rao
- Director: Souri Banerjee
- Students: 1,400 (2019)
- Location: Dubai International Academic City, Dubai, UAE; 25°7′54″N 55°25′11″E
- Campus: Urban; 14 acres (0.057 km^{2}) College Town; 2,960 acres (12.0 km^{2})
- Colors: Sky Blue (Crayola) Fire Engine Red Yellow
- Website: www.bits-pilani.ac.in/dubai

Birla Institute of Technology & Science, Pilani - Dubai (BITS Pilani, Dubai Campus or BPDC) is a private technical research university and a constituent college of Dubai International Academic City. It became the international campus of BITS Pilani in 2000, making it the second campus established (other campuses: Pilani, Goa, Hyderabad, Mumbai). It is the first Indian university to have an overseas campus. The institute is backed by the Aditya Birla Group and is one of the first six institutes to be awarded the Institute of Eminence status in 2018.

BITS Pilani, Dubai offers undergraduate, graduate and doctoral programs in engineering and business management domains under 10 academic departments. It enrolls about 1,400 students every year, mostly from India, UAE, Oman, Qatar and other GCC countries.

== History ==
=== Inception ===
The Birla Education Trust was founded in 1929; the intermediate college became a degree college and later offered postgraduate courses. The masters programme in electronics began in 1955.

Reacting to early criticism about the project, contemporary advisor Thomas Drew said:

In my judgment to attempt to develop an American institution in India would be like trying to graft apples on a pine tree. We have not been asked to make such an attempt. We were asked to help devise in India an Indian technological school to produce graduates with the know-how to produce knowledge pertinent for India.... In many respects they consider us immature, rude, hypocritical barbarians who in certain respects happened to hit it lucky. To be viable in India an institution must be framed with Indian values in mind.

BITS Pilani became a deemed university established under Section 3 of the UGC Act, 1956 by notification No. F.12-23/63.U-2 of 18 June 1964.

In 1964, the Birla Colleges of Humanities, Commerce, Engineering, Pharmacy and Science were merged to form the Birla Institute of Technology & Science. The board provided direction in developing a curriculum, selecting equipment, upgrading the library and recruiting (and training) an Indian faculty. To quicken the pace of reform he convinced C. R. Mitra to be the new director of the institute. Mitra advocated a "practice school" internship program as a requirement for faculty and students. The Practice School Program is still a requirement for students in BITS.

According to Robert Kargon and Stuart Leslie:

BITS offered an opportunity to build a leading technological university in India responsive to India's goals, to produce practising engineers who will be in a position to graduate and to build industries in India, under Indian conditions. With its emphasis on the Practice School and ties to Indian industry, it helped educate Indian industrialists along with Indian engineers who would remain in India, in contrast to many other engineering colleges in India, most of whose graduates would leave the country after obtaining their basic engineering education. The Ford Foundation Evaluators...proudly noted that the Indian government, despite having given no direct financial support, was looking to BITS to provide a model for future development in education in engineering and science in India.

=== Multi-campus expansion ===
Ghanshyam Das Birla, was born on 10 April 1894 at Pilani village, in the Indian state then known as Rajputana, as a member of the Maheshwari Marwari community. Later, Birla inherited the family business and moved to further diversify them into other areas. He became the founding president of Harijan Sevak Sangh founded by Mahatma Gandhi in Delhi in 1932 . Birla was a close associate and a steady supporter of Mahatma Gandhi, whom he met for the first time in 1916. Gandhi stayed at Birla's home in New Delhi during the last four months of his life.

Envisioning infrastructural development in his hometown, Birla founded the Birla Engineering College (rechristened as Birla Institute of Technology and Science in 1964) in Pilani and the Technological Institute of Textile & Sciences in Bhiwani among other educational institutions in 1943. Both colleges have evolved over the years to develop into one of India's best engineering schools. Dr. K.K. Birla, who took over as the Chairman in 1983, realized the need for providing top class higher education facility to greater number of promising students in science and technology.

In 1999, enrollment expanded from 2,500 to 4,000 and campuses were founded in Dubai (2000) and Goa (2004). In 2006, BITS Pilani acquired 81 hectares (200 acres) of land from the Andhra Pradesh government through the Hyderabad Urban Development Authority for a new campus. The land is located in Jawaharnagar, Shameerpet Mandal in the Rangareddy district. The BITS Pilani Hyderabad campus opened in 2008; the school also has a virtual university and an extension center in Bangalore. BITS School of Management (BITSoM) was established in January 2021 and offers a 2-year full time residential MBA. BITSoM has its interim campus in Hiranandani Knowledge Park, Powai, Mumbai while the 60-acre permanent campus is being set up in the Mumbai Metropolitan Region.

Consequent upon the demise of Dr. K.K. Birla in 2008, Dr. Kumar Mangalam Birla was elected as the Chancellor and Smt. Shobhana Bhartia was appointed as the Pro-Chancellor.

==== Dubai Campus ====
BITS Pilani Dubai was the second campus of the university, set up in 2000 in Al Ghurair University Campus. Prof. M. Ramachandran was its founding director. It was then relocated to Dubai Knowledge Village, and again, to its permanent campus with student housing at Dubai International Academic City in September 2007. It is approved by the Ministry of Human Resource Development, Government of India and University Grants Commission (UGC), India and is permitted by Knowledge & the Human Development Authority (KHDA), Government of Dubai.

== Campus ==
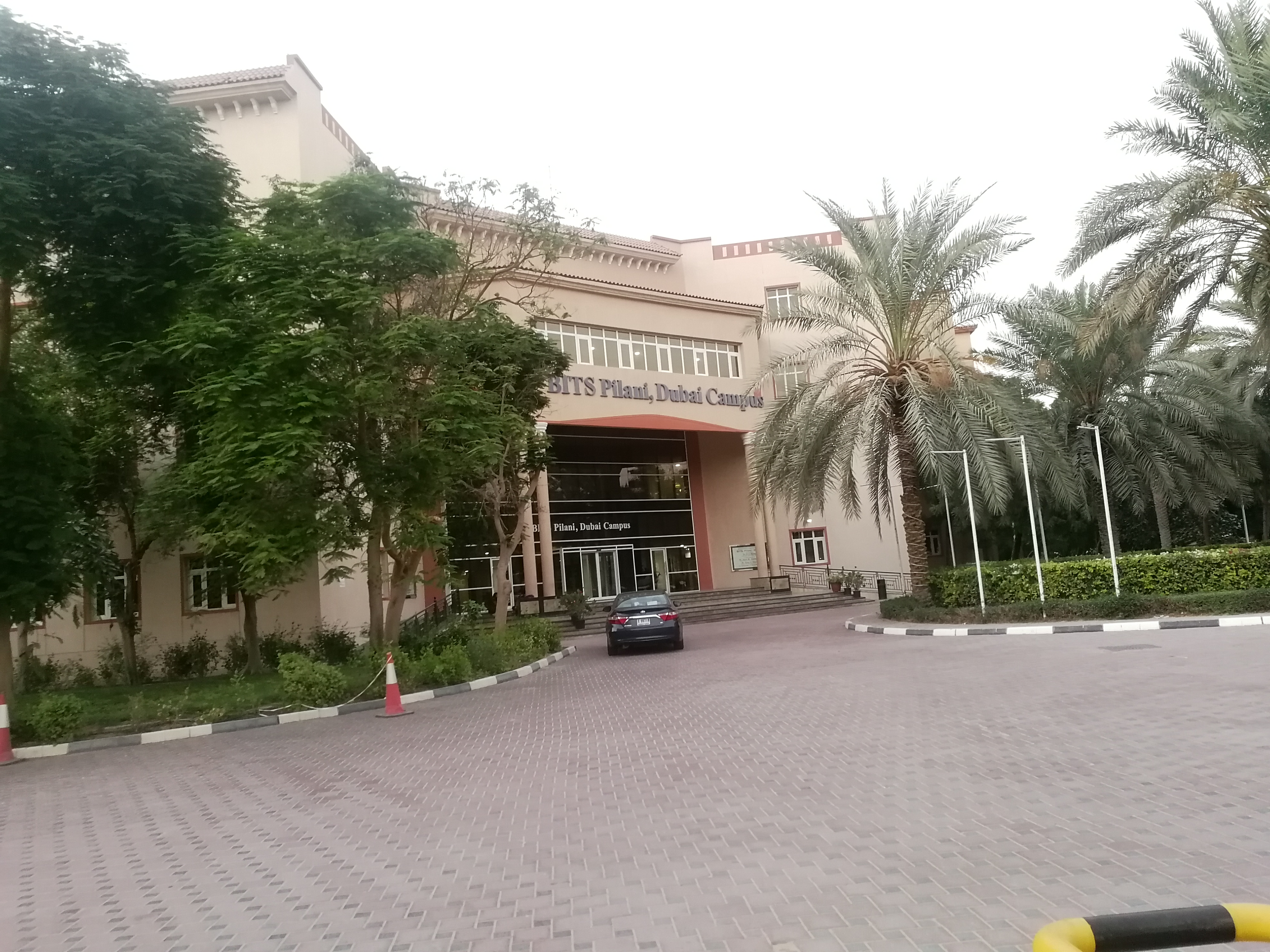
New campus in Dubai International Academic City

=== Academic City ===
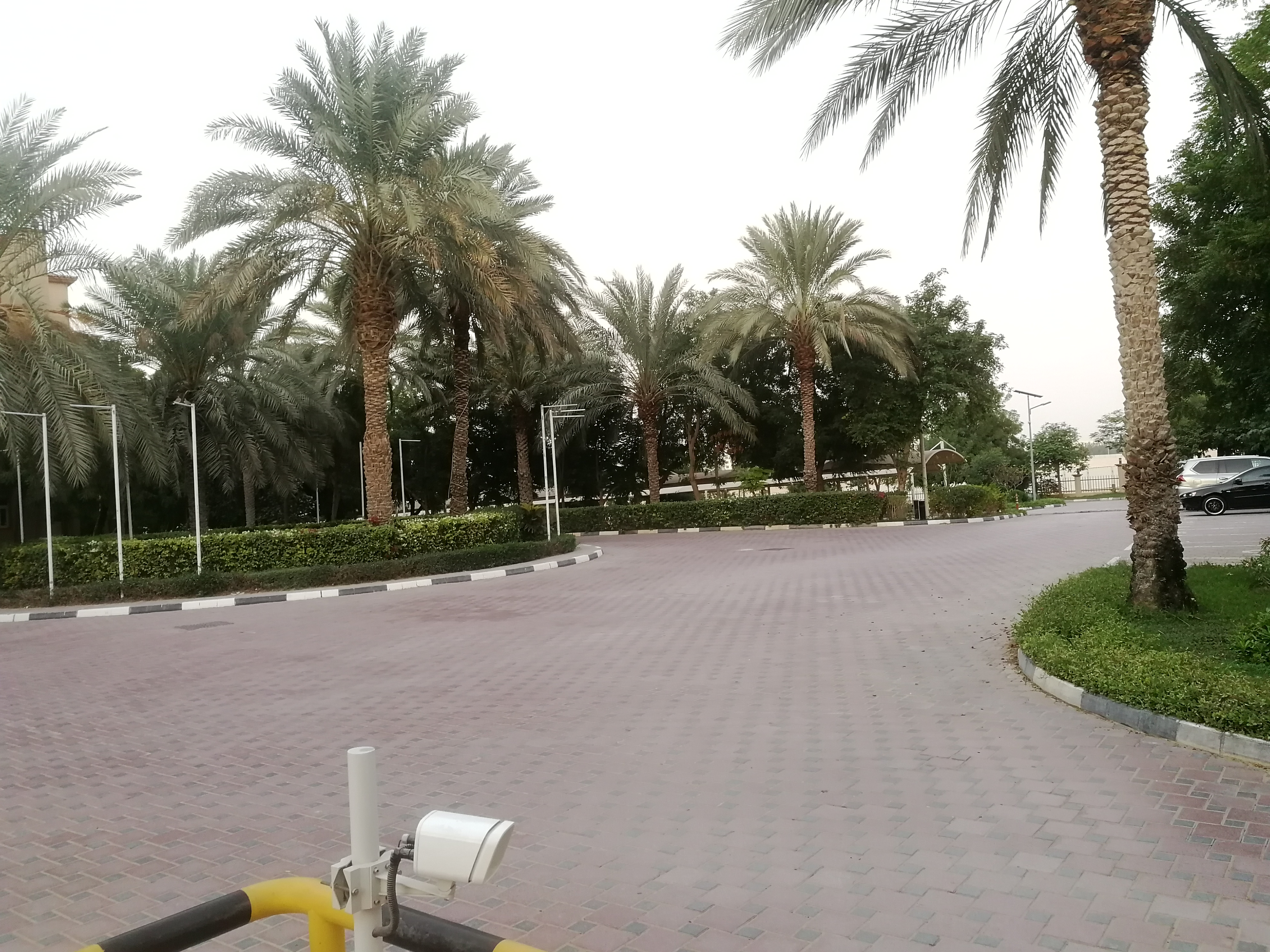
Palm trees on campus

DIAC is a university town of 1,200 hectares (2,960 acres) and consists of 27 colleges and universities, 3 innovation centers and enrolls around 27,500 students. Students from the constituent colleges have access to its amenities like food court, residential halls, markets and restaurants.

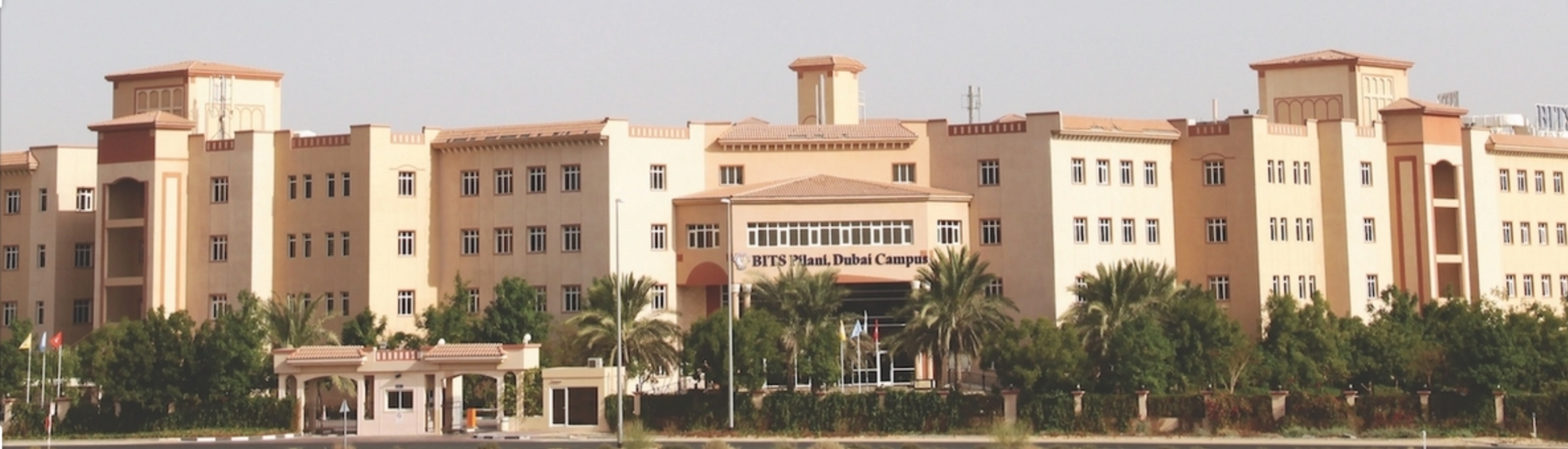
BITS Pilani – Dubai Campus

BITS Pilani, Dubai has nine buildings comprising hostels, the main building and academic departments spanning over 5.7 hectares (14 acres):

1. The academic block has lecture halls, academic & administrative departments, conference halls, student & faculty lounges, a mini-mart, a sports complex, an auditorium and technical laboratories.
2. Mechanical block consists of a workshop area on the ground floor and mechanical, civil, robotics and other interdepartmental labs on other floors.
3. The library block consists of a library, discussion rooms, an OPAC & internet browsing centre, an activity room and a cafeteria.
4. The institute has 6 hostels in total. The boys' hostel consists of four buildings (A, B, C, D) that share common facilities whereas the girls' hostel consists of two buildings (G, H) that share common facilities.
5. Hostel blocks have mess halls, prayer hall, common room, recreation room, laundromat and gym.

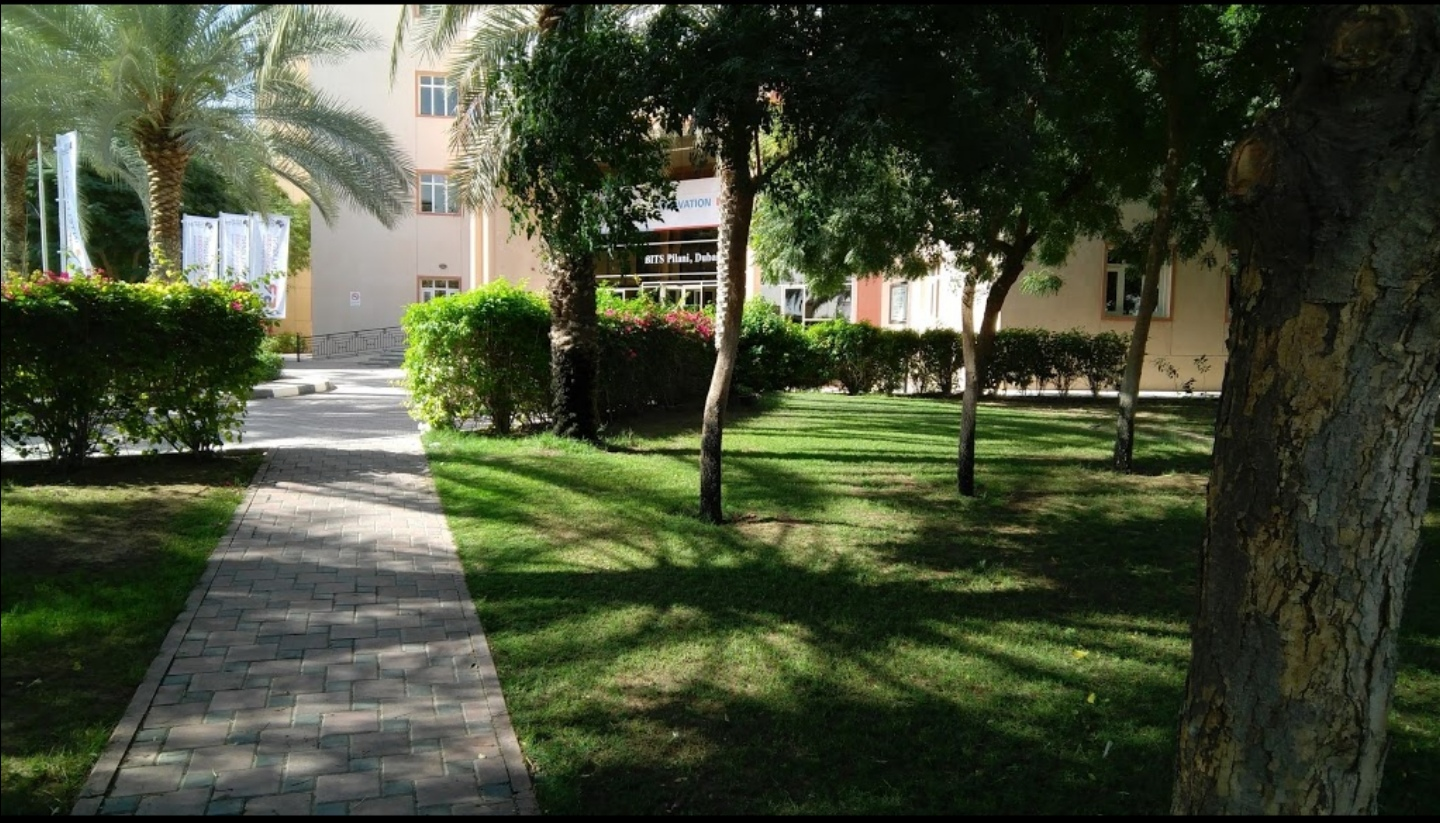
Main building as seen through a park on campus

The campus also consists of a full-length football field, indoor badminton court, race track, lawn tennis court, cricket nets, basketball court, volleyball court, indoor games and student activities section.

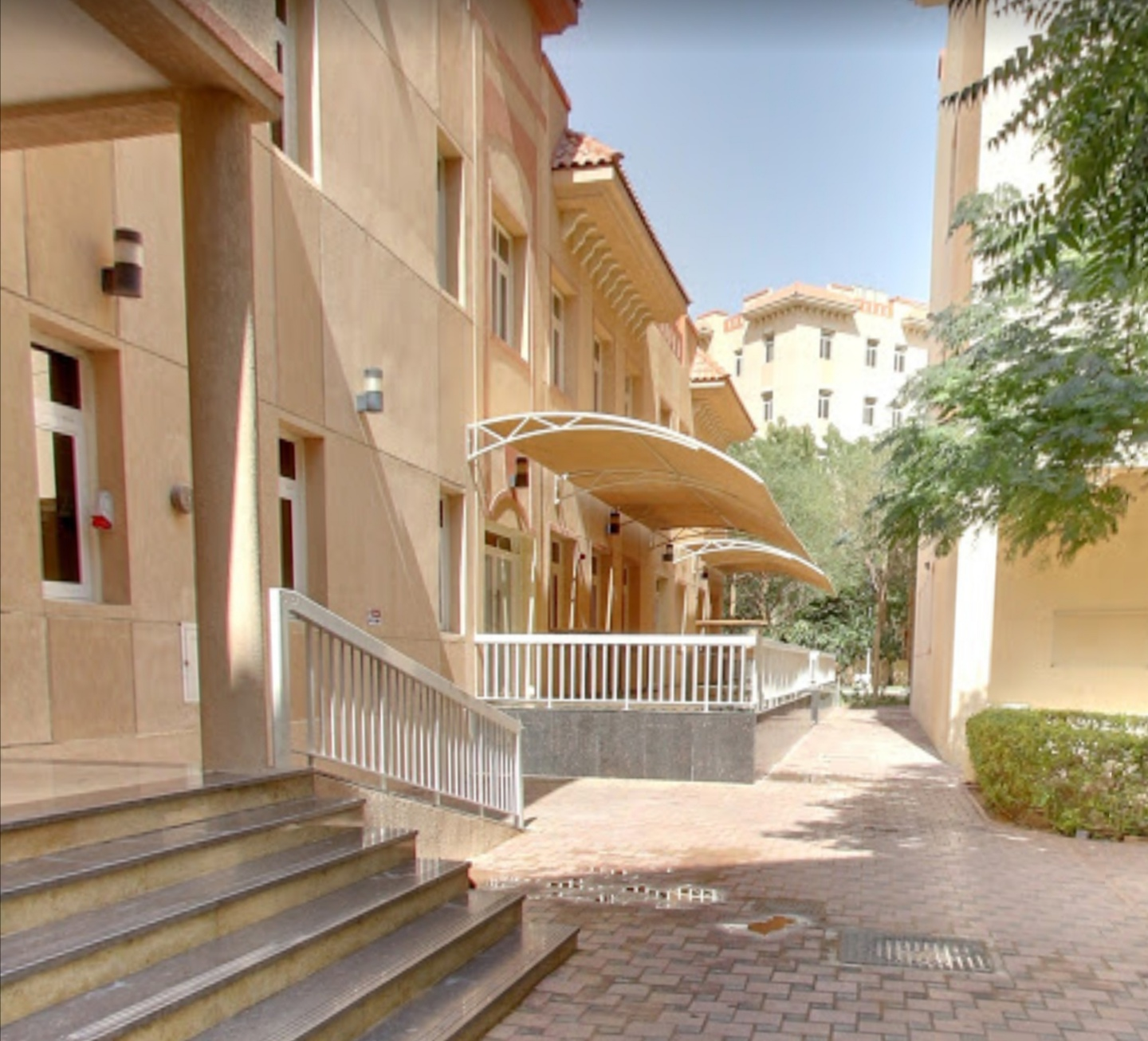
Cafeteria

=== Labs ===
Labs at campus include - Advanced Molecular Biology Lab, Analog Electronics Lab, Biology Lab, Chemical Engineering Lab I & II, Chemistry Lab Communication Lab, Computer Aided Design Lab, Computer Programming Lab, Concrete Lab, Creative Lab, Digital Design Lab, Electrical Machines Lab, Engineering Graphics Lab, Environmental Lab, Fluid Machinery lab, Genetic Engineering Lab, Heat Transfer Lab, Industrial Microbiology & Bioprocess Engineering Lab, Instrumental Methods of Analysis Lab, Instrumentation Lab, Intelligent Computing Facility, Mechatronics & Robotics Lab, MEMS Lab, Materials Testing Lab, Microbiology Lab, Microprocessor Programming & Interfacing Lab, Networking and Distributed Systems Lab, Petroleum Lab, Physics Lab, Power Electronics Lab, Prime Movers and Fluid Machinery Lab, Process Control Lab, Production Techniques I & II Labs, Signal and Simulation Lab, Software Systems Lab, Soil Mechanics and Foundation Engineering Lab, Survey Lab, Transport Phenomena Lab, Transportation Engineering Lab, Workshop Prime Movers & Fluid Mechanics Lab.

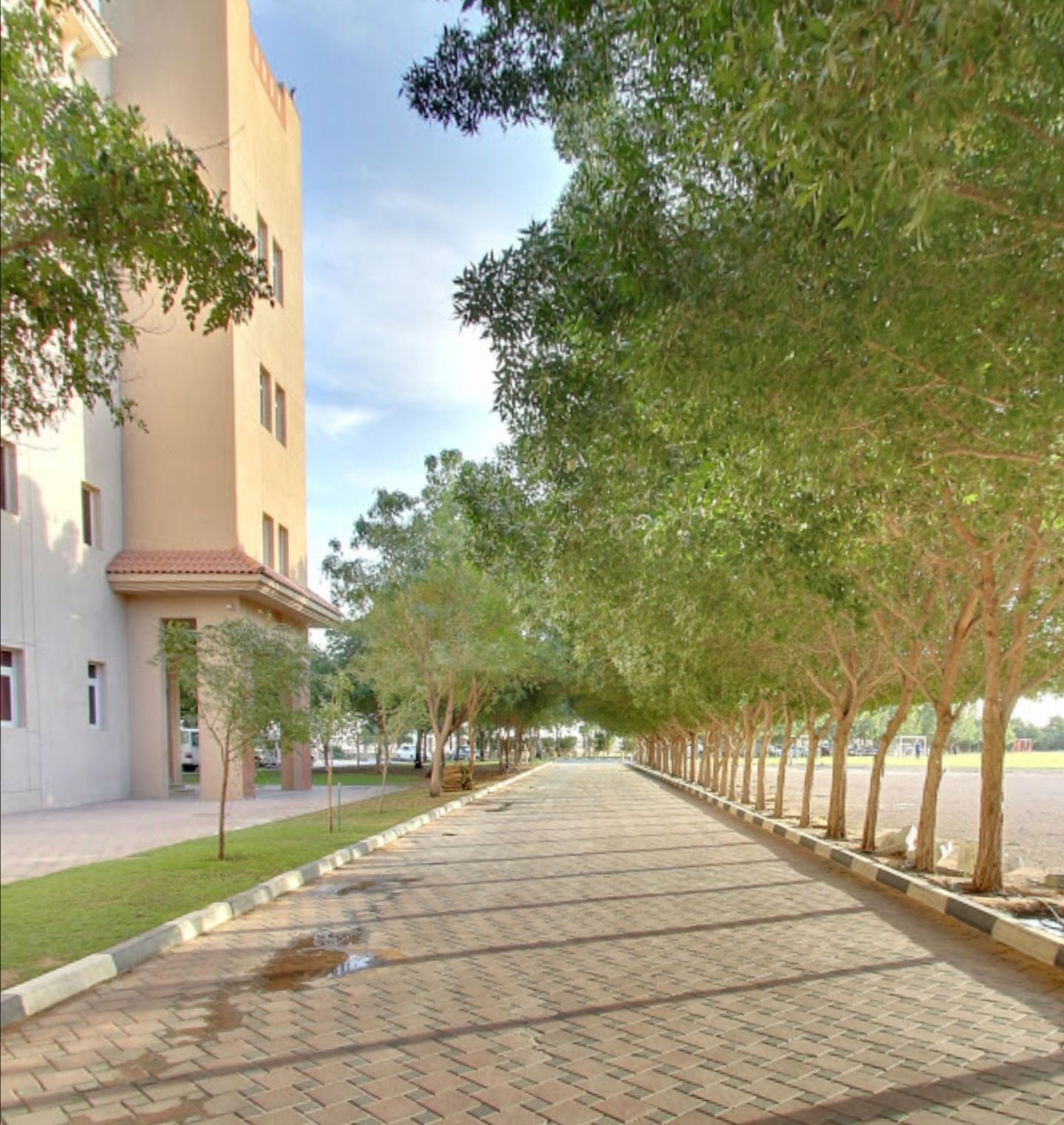
Way towards the parking lot with academic block on the left

== Administration ==
The college administration is divided into eight divisions:

- Faculty Affairs
- Sponsored Research and Consultancy
- International Programmes and Collaboration Division (IPCD)
- Practice School
- Student Welfare Division (SWD)
- Academic - Undergraduate Studies
- Academic - Graduate Studies and Research
- Alumni Relations

== Academics ==
=== Departments ===
BITS Pilani, Dubai Campus has 10 academic departments:

- Biotechnology
- Chemical Engineering
- Civil Engineering
- Computer Science
- Electrical and Electronics Engineering
- General Sciences
- Humanities and Social Sciences
- Mechanical Engineering
- Mathematics
- Finance

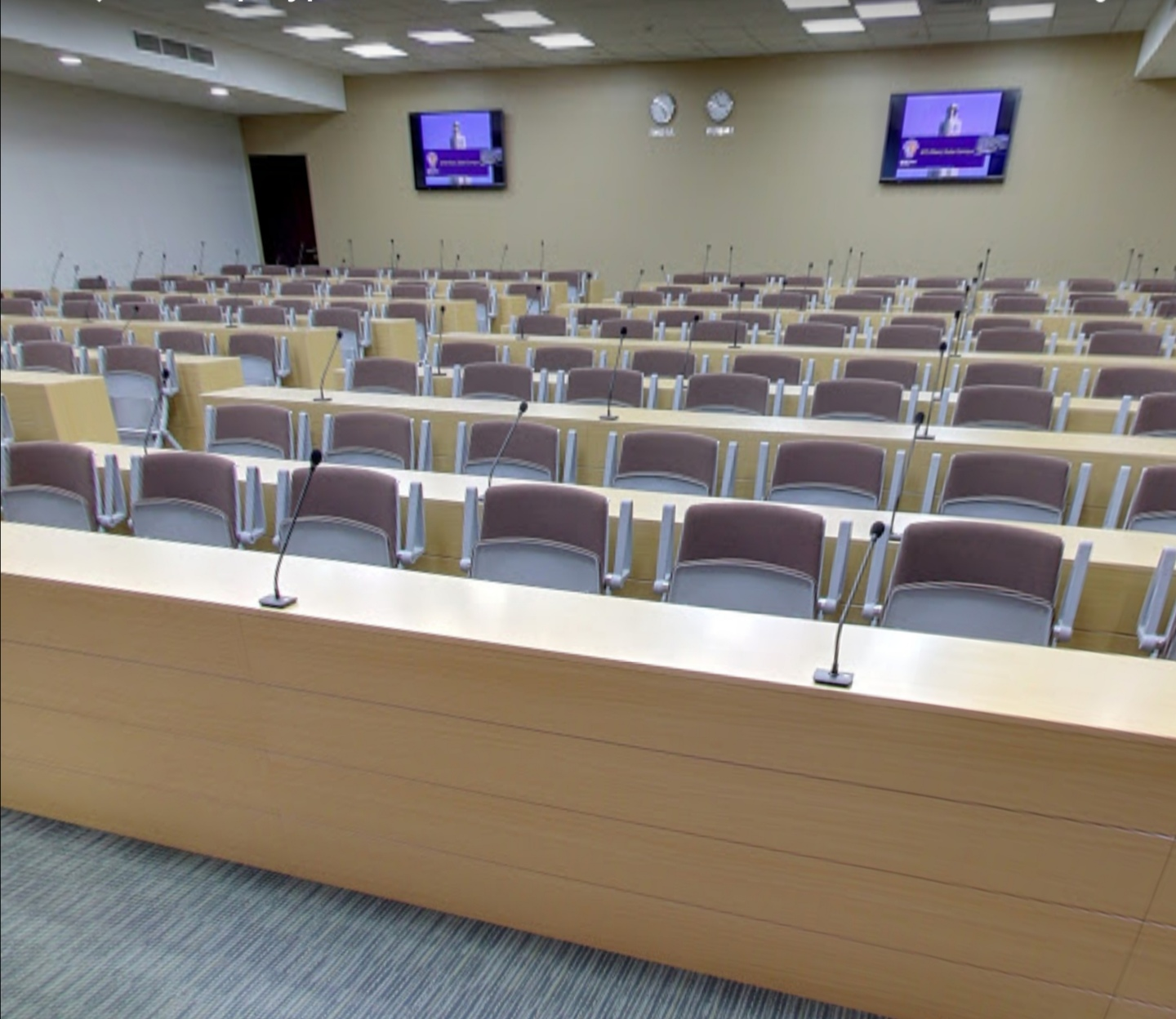
Lecture hall

All major and minor courses for undergraduate and postgraduate studies are offered under these departments. Experiment and research labs along with other facilities set up in departmental buildings or floors are also governed by their respective departments.

The departments also host various conferences, seminars, and research events like BITS Research Day and IEEE International Conference on Modelling Simulation & Intelligent Computing (MoSICom).

The following multi-disciplinary centres are located in BPDC:

- MP Sharma Collaboration Centre
- Centre for Innovation, Incubation and Entrepreneurship
- Centre for Satellite Communications
- Centre for Higher Education
- Centre for Excellence in Cyber Security and Digital Forensics

=== Undergraduate programs ===
BITS Pilani, Dubai Campus offers 4-year Integrated bachelor of engineering (B.E.) programs at the undergraduate level. The institute also offers 5-year dual bachelor's degrees in two major fields. These programs are offered directly under the 10 academic departments. Course structure is flexible and curriculum allows students to enroll in general science, engineering, mathematics, management, humanities and other inter-disciplinary courses. Minor degrees in Aeronautics, Data Science, Finance, Material Science, Robotics, Philosophy, Economics and Politics are also awarded along with the undergraduate degree after completion of additional courses.

=== Graduate and research programs ===
The institute awards Master of Engineering (M.E.) degree in the fields of Design engineering, Microelectronics, Software Systems, Electrical (with specialization in Power Electronics and Drives). After meeting the eligibility criteria of minimum 60% in the qualifying undergraduate degree, students are selected through an aptitude test and interview.

BPDC also offers Master of Business Administration (M.B.A.) programmes to working professionals and graduates in the fields of Engineering and Technology Management and IT Enabled Services Management.

=== Doctoral programs ===
PhD degrees and research programmes are offered in various subject domains on a part-time and full-time basis.

BITS Pilani, Dubai Campus has also entered into a research collaboration with the International Center for Biosaline Agriculture (ICBA), Dubai, UAE.

=== Practice School ===
Practice School (PS) is an internship programme for students of BITS Pilani university, through which students are placed in the industry for a hands-on learning experience. PS-1, a two-month internship programme for the summer after the second year, is compulsory for all students. PS-2 is an extended internship programme, usually of five and a half months duration that students may go for in their final year. The students are graded by the off-campus BITS faculty and the PS mentor. The allocation is based on the academic record of the student and is managed in-campus, separate from the Indian campuses. Every PS station roughly accommodates 6-7 students.

Students can also opt for Thesis School (TS) program instead of Practice School II where they will have to work under a professor either on campus or off campus on some research area related to their discipline. In case of an off-campus thesis, an on-campus guide will coordinate with the off-campus guide.

=== Admissions ===
BITS Pilani is offered to students based on their performance in the All-India Entrance Examination, called BITS Admission Test (BITSAT). BITS Pilani also has the policy of accepting State and National Board toppers. There is no reservation of seats on the basis of caste or category. BITSAT. is a computer based test and is held at BITS authorised test centres. The examination chiefly covers topics, based on the NCERT higher secondary curriculum, in Physics, Chemistry and Mathematics, and reasoning and analytical skills in Logic and English. Any student having a minimum aggregate of 75% in Physics, Maths and Chemistry, and a minimum of 60% marks in each of the BITSAT subjects individually is eligible to apply to the campus.

For international students, Dubai Campus also accepts SAT Subject Tests. Since the mode of instruction is English, students who have passed the qualifying examination in a non-English medium must satisfy the minimum requirement of TOEFL or IELTS.

== Student life & culture ==
Students at BPDC are mostly of Indian nationality and comprise day scholars and hostellers. Day scholars are residents of Dubai, Sharjah and Abu Dhabi.

=== DIAC Residential Halls (outside BITS campus) ===
DIAC residential halls shared by students of different universities. They are equipped with retail shops, leisure facilities, library and shopping centres.

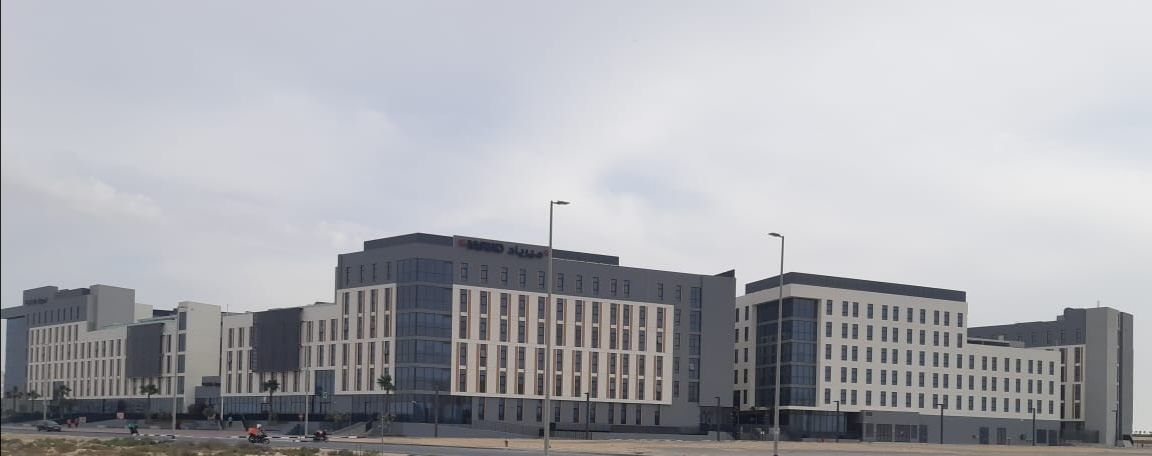
Myriad residential hall

- Myriad: A student accommodation located in front of the gate number 3 of BITS campus. It consists of twin rooms, single rooms or studio rooms. The rooms have an adjoining shower room, with shared kitchen lounges across the building. The halls have other facilities like a gym, a laundromat, dedicated blocks for male and female residents, sports facilities such as a swimming pool and basketball court, and entertainment facilities such as the outdoor amphitheatre and Myriacade (gaming and recreation room).
- KSK Homes: These residences are located almost 1 km from the BITS campus. They consist of single, double and twin rooms and have a variety of social spaces, floor lounges, a communal kitchen, a dining hall, gaming areas, courtyards, gym and study centres.

=== Clubs and associations ===
BPDC has various technical and non-technical clubs, associations and societies. Technical clubs include student chapters of international associations like Association for Computing Machinery, Institute of Electrical and Electronics Engineers, American Society of Mechanical Engineers, Institution of Engineers (India), American Institute of Chemical Engineers, SAE International and American Society of Heating, Refrigerating and Air-Conditioning Engineers. Other technical clubs like Google Developer Student Club, Microsoft Tech Club, Linux User Group, Association for Electronic Engineers (AOEE) and Intelligent Flying Object for Reconnaissance (IFOR) fall under academic departments.

The institute also has student-run cultural clubs and societies, including Groove (Dance Club), Trebel (Music Club), Shades (Art and Craft Club), Reflexions (Photography Club), Paribhasha (Theatre Society), Oh Crop! (Design Club), Expressions (Public Speaking and Literary Club), The Wall Street Club (Finance, Economics and Management Club), Flummoxed (Quiz Club), BITS Motorsports, Allure (Fashion Club), Guild (Gaming Club) and Supernova (Astronomy Club). The goal of such clubs is to enrich the Institute's social and cultural life. Apart from these, it also has student chapters of international organizations like Make a Difference, Toastmasters International, Model United Nations, which are currently defunct.

=== Events and activities ===
- BITS Sports Festival (BSF): An inter-university sports event where approximately 45 universities from all over UAE compete against each other in more than 10 sporting events for Men and Women. These events are sponsored by brands like Coca-Cola, Nikon, KFC and Radio Mirchi
- Jashn: One of UAE's (claimed to be) largest inter-university cultural festivals. In 2019, it started with Zakir Khan taking the stage and ended with the celebration of the semester as Sunburn Festival transformed BPDC into UAE's first-ever Sunburn Campus.
- Recharge: Inter-hostel sports competition supported by various teams and fan clubs donning their own merchandise.
- Sparks: An Intra College Cultural Festival which is organised by the Event Management Committee (EMC) every year in the month of October. In this event, different student clubs and bodies collectively conduct several events.
- ENGINuity: An annual inter-university techno-managerial and innovation festival that serves as a platform for students to show their technical affinity. It aims at forming a conglomerate of students with a mutual interest in science, technology and management.

Apart from these festivals, academic departments and student clubs organize technical, non-technical and cultural events and competitions like Technofest (rebranded to BTF), Ethnic day, Spectrum, and ARTEX (Art Exhibition) throughout the semester. Each academic year at BPDC begins with a cultural event for freshmen known as 'icebreakers', which is held after the orientation.

In 2023, BPDC launched its student pico-satellite program known as MAHASAT under the direction of Mylswamy Annadurai, former Director of the U R Rao Satellite Centre, Indian Space Research Organisation. As the first step of this program, the students tested five Pico Satellites using a Drone Satellite Launch Vehicle (DSLV) at Sanad Academy, Dubai.

=== BPDC Unplugged - Radio Station ===
BPDC unplugged is campus radio station (CRS) of BITS Pilani, Dubai. It is an in-house radio that generally broadcasts various events around the campus and conducts podcasts on regular basis. As of 2025, this radio station is offline and is considered to be defunct.

== Notable alumni ==
- Gaurav Chaudhary (Technical Guruji) - YouTube personality, tech vlogger, nano-science researcher.
- Sunny Hinduja - Indian film and television actor.
- Adil Ibrahim - Indian radio jockey, television host and actor.

== Other campuses ==
- Pilani Campus
- Goa Campus
- Hyderabad Campus

== See also ==
- Institutes of Eminence
- Dubai International Academic City
