= Birla Institute of Technology and Science, Pilani – Mumbai Campus =

University campus in Maharashtra, India

Coordinates: 19.2554586°N 73.2020028°E

- Motto: ज्ञानं परम् बलं Gyanam paramam balam
- Motto in English: "Knowledge is Supreme Power"
- Type: Private Deemed University, Institute of Eminence
- Established: 2024; 2 years ago
- Affiliations: BITS Pilani
- Chancellor: Kumar Mangalam Birla
- Vice-Chancellor: V. Ramgopal Rao
- Location: Kalyan, Mumbai, Maharashtra, India
- Campus: 63 acres (25 ha); Suburban
- Website: www.bits-pilani.ac.in/mumbai-campus/

Birla Institute of Technology and Science, Pilani – Mumbai Campus is a constituent campus of the BITS Pilani. It was formally inaugurated by Finance Minister Nirmala Sitharaman in February 2024. The campus houses three institutions—School of Management (BITSoM), School of Law (BITSLAW), and School of Design (BITSDES), with a focus on interdisciplinary higher education.

== Campus ==
The campus is located in Kamba, on the outskirts of Kalyan, within the Mumbai Metropolitan Region, about 60 kilometres (37 mi) northeast of central Mumbai. Spread across 63 acres (25 ha), it features academic blocks, a Centre of Excellence, moot court, hybrid classrooms, digital studios, an incubation centre, and residential and sports facilities designed for collaborative learning environment.

== Academic programmes ==
The campus hosts three technical institutions under BITS Pilani:

- BITS School of Management (BITSoM) – Established in 2021, BITSoM offers a two-year full-time MBA program, with a curriculum centred on leadership, innovation, and global business.
- BITS Law School (BITSLAW) – Established in 2023, BITSLAW offers two five-year integrated degree programmes: BA, LLB (Hons) and BBA, LLB (Hons), with an emphasis on technology, business law, and policy.
- BITS Design School (BITSDES) – Established in 2024, BITSDES offers a four-year Bachelor of Design (Hons) programme with a focus on creativity, digital fluency, and trans-disciplinary thinking.

== See also ==
- Birla Institute of Technology and Science, Pilani
