= Mebelkart =

Online marketplace India

- Industry: Home & Living Online shopping (E-commerce)
- Founded: 2012
- Headquarters: Bangalore, India
- Area served: India
- Key people: Rahul Agrawal; (CEO); Ranjeet Vimal; (CTO); Nikhil Saraf; (COO)
- Products: Furniture; Furnishings; Home Décor; Baby & Kids; Housekeeping; Appliances; Modular Kitchens
- Website: mebelkart.com

Mebelkart was an online marketplace for furniture and household goods headquartered in Bangalore, India. Mebelkart was a managed marketplace, providing contact between vendors and buyers of furniture, home furnishings and related products, In November 2015, Mebelkart also began to provide contact between interior designers and consumers.

== History ==
Mebelkart was started by Rahul Agrawal (alumnus of Indian Institute of Technology Kanpur), Ranjeet Vimal (alumnus of Indian Institute of Technology, Bombay) and Nikhil Saraf (alumnus of BITS Pilani) in November, 2012.

In 2015, Mebelkart acquired 53central, a crowd bargaining platform that enables group buying options for sports enthusiasts, for an undisclosed amount.

In August 2015, AskMe.com, an online search, listings and deals portal, invested $20 million in Mebelkart and acquired a significant market share in it.

Mebelkart ceased to operate in early 2017 owing to inability to close a fresh round of funding.

== Controversies ==
In April 2016, the online furniture store Housefull International sued Mebelkart for selling imitations and defaulting on its payments. Housefull had ceased its association with Mebelkart some months earlier as the marketplace had large outstanding debts, but claimed that fake Housefull products were still being sold through Mebelkart's website.

DNA India reported in June 2016 that several different vendors claimed that Mebelkart had been withholding payments, and as a result the vendors had stopped selling their products through the marketplace.
