= Stuff (magazine) =

British consumer electronics magazine

- Cover of the December 2024 issue (UK)
- Editor: Dan Grabham
- Categories: Consumer electronics
- Frequency: Monthly
- Total circulation: 29,142 (2020)
- Founded: November 1996 (UK); 1999 (US)
- First issue: November 1996 (UK); 1999 (US)
- Company: Kelsey Media
- Country: UK, U.S., Turkey, Germany, Russia, Czech Republic, France, the Netherlands, Ukraine, Spain, Romania, Lithuania, China, Philippines, Thailand, Taiwan, Malaysia, India, Indonesia, Singapore, Middle East, Mexico Korea, Poland, Portugal and Vietnam
- Language: English
- Website: Official UK site
- ISSN: 1364-9639

Stuff is a British consumer electronics magazine published by Kelsey Media.

== History ==
Stuff was first published in Britain in November 1996 by Dennis Publishing. A bimonthly title, it followed the success of magazines such as FHM and Loaded in being pitched toward a young, male audience, with a focus on consumer goods and electronics.

The brand took a more lifestyle-orientated direction in 1998, before publishing group Haymarket bought the title in January 1999 and refocused the magazine to consumer electronics.

In May 2018, the brand was sold to Kelsey Media, after the attempt to sell the brand to Future plc (which already owned competing title T3) fell through due to regulatory concerns.

Haymarket Media Group CEO Kevin Costello said at the time of the sale: "Stuff is a truly iconic brand, trusted by its tech-loving followers to entertain, educate, and inspire. It's been a big part of the Haymarket story, but our strategic focus has shifted, and Stuff needs a new home, where the brand can really achieve its potential."

== British edition ==
The British version of the magazine is focused on gadgets, games, and gear, including innovative and exciting consumer electronics. "Hot Stuff" is the news section concerned with new or forthcoming products. Top 10s of currently available items are featured toward the back of the magazine.

== American edition ==
The American edition of Stuff was launched in 1999 by Dennis's US arm. Spun off from a regular section in another of the group's titles, Maxim, Stuff's American edition featured reviews of consumer electronics alongside other articles of interest to a predominantly male audience. In June 2007, all but one of Dennis's US titles were sold to private equity firm Quadrangle Group, which closed the magazine later the same year.

== Malaysian edition ==
Founded in 2004, Stuff Malaysia is one of the country's leading and best-selling consumer electronics, technology, and lifestyle magazines. It is published by Catcha Lifestyle Publications Sdn. Bhd.

== Singapore edition ==
Stuff magazine has been locally published in Singapore since 2004. The magazine gained recognition and established itself as a leading name in the consumer electronics and tech lifestyle segment in Singapore. Its website launched in December 2013. The magazine was also relaunched and published by content owner Haymarket Media Group. Stuff Singapore closed in January 2018.

== Indian edition ==
Stuff India, the Indian edition of Stuff, launched on 1 December 2008 with a cover price of Rs. 100 ($2). The magazine launched with a print run of 40,000 copies. Stuff India is edited by Nishant Padhiar, formerly the editor of T3 and consultant editor on AV MAX.

== South African edition ==
Stuff South Africa was published under license by Times Media between 2007 and December 2012. In November 2012, the publishers announced that the licence had not been renewed, but that a new publishing venture would continue the title. Circulation has been recorded at 25,811.

== Mexican edition ==
Stuff México was published under license by Grupo Medios starting June 2012. The magazine launched with a print run of 50,000 copies. Stuff México is no longer edited since 2015.

== Middle Eastern edition ==
Stuff Middle East was published under license by Motivate Publishing in Dubai, United Arab Emirates, between 2007 and 2018.

== Website ==
The website for Stuff was launched in 2004 and was relaunched in both November 2006 and October 2021.
