= Prateek Suri =

Indian born entrepreneur

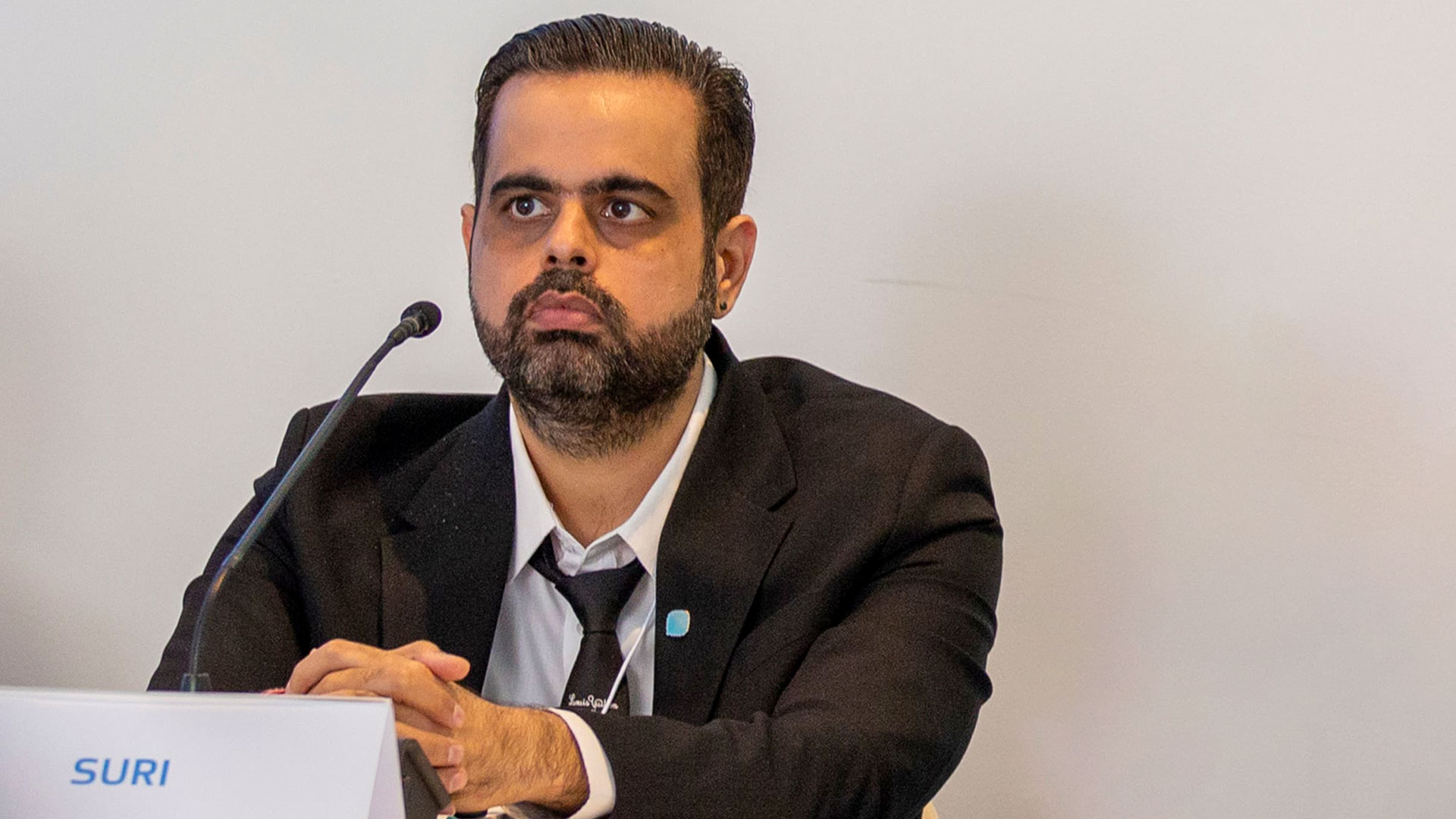
- Prateek Suri at the World Governments Summit 2026
- Born: Prateek Suri; April 5, 1988 (age 38); Delhi, India
- Education: BITS Pilani (B.Sc., mechanical engineering)
- Alma mater: Modern School (New Delhi)
- Occupation: entrepreneur

Prateek Suri (born April 5, 1988) is an Indian-born entrepreneur and investor, he is the founder of Maser Group. Suri is considered one of the wealthiest Indian nationals residing in Africa.

== Early life and education ==
Suri was born in Delhi, India. He attended Modern School, Barakhamba Road, completing his secondary education in 2006. He later enrolled at the Birla Institute of Technology and Science (BITS Pilani), Dubai Campus, where he earned a bachelor's degree in mechanical engineering in 2010.

== Career ==
During his undergraduate studies, Suri interned at Keihin Panalfa Limited in 2008. After graduation, he worked briefly as a sales and marketing associate at Kingsmen Middle East LLC. He also operated a small trading business in Delhi, focusing on consumer electronics.

In 2014, Suri founded Maser Group, operating in the Indian market, where the company focused on consumer electronics. In 2019, Suri expanded the company's operations to Dubai, from which electronic devices were redistributed to markets in Africa, the company sold over 800,000 units across the continent. Under his leadership, Maser Group's consumer electronics division got acquired in 2024. Following the acquisition of Maser, Suri launched MDR Investments, a venture capital firm active in projects across Africa. Suri is also involved in mining activities in several African countries and in Argentina.

Suri is the founder of the Maser Foundation, which supports initiatives development in underserved African regions. The foundation has partnered with local governments and NGOs. In 2024, Suri published a memoir titled Gateway to Africa, which details his entrepreneurial experiences in the African business markets.

In 2026, Suri launched Emarald, a building materials and construction brand in the Gulf region.

== Awards and recognition ==
Award	Category	Year	Result
Gulf Business Awards	Investment Leader of the Year	2024	Won
Lokmat	Young Corporate Leader Award	2023	Won
Gulf Business Awards	Technology Business Leader of the Year	2023	Won

Suri was listed in the Arabian Business 2024 special issue of Dubai 100 and in February 2025, he received the Legends of Entrepreneurship Award from Entrepreneur Middle East. In 2026, Suri attended the World Governments Summit, where he was a speaker. Gulf Business named Suri in its list of the “Top 50 Leaders and CEOs of 2026”.

== Personal life ==
Suri is married to Deepali Dey, and they have a daughter.
