= Oasis (festival) =

Annual cultural festival of BITS Pilani

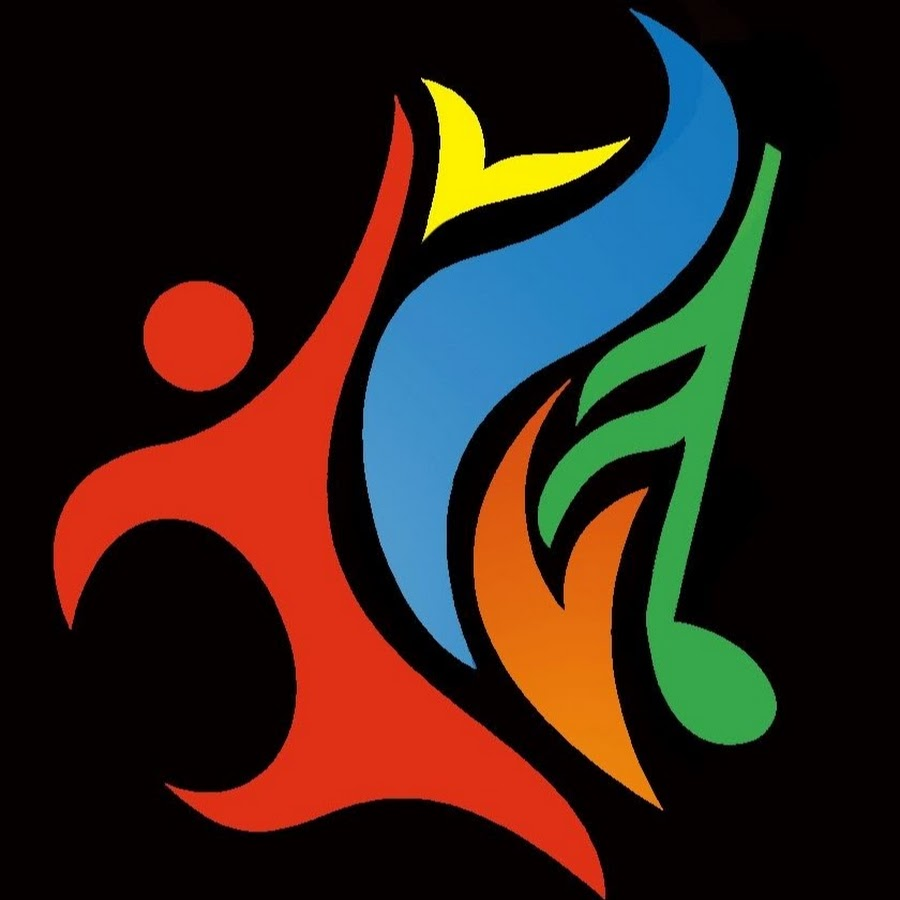
- Oasis logo
- Status: Active
- Genre: Cultural festival
- Frequency: Annual (53 editions)
- Venue: BITS Pilani, Pilani campus
- Locations: Pilani, Rajasthan, India
- Years active: 1971–present
- Attendance: over 8-10,000 attendees from 350+ colleges
- Organiser: Students' Council for Cultural Activities (StuCCA), BITS Pilani
- Website: bits-oasis.org

Oasis is an annual cultural festival of the Birla Institute of Technology and Science, Pilani (BITS Pilani). The festival features competitions and performances across a range of artistic disciplines including music, dance, drama, fashion, comedy and other genres of performing and visual arts.

Oasis staged professional shows including semi-professional music competitions such as Rocktaves and student-led organizations.

== History ==
Oasis was formed in 1971 as an intra-college event, eventually expanding into a festival.

Past themes included:

- 2011 – The Road Trip
- 2012 – The Reinvention
- 2013 – The Elements
- 2014 – The '90s Show
- 2015 – Around the World in 96 Hours
- 2016 – Of Gods and Men
- 2017 – Realms of Fiction
- 2018 – The Far Our Fest
- 2019 – Neon Noir
- 2020 – Alchemist's Prophecy
- 2022 – Demesne of the Lost Gold (50th edition celebration)
- 2023 – Grimoire Galore
- 2024 – Regal Roulette
- 2025 – Whispers of Edo

== Events and activities ==
Oasis has hosted over 50 events across various artistic and intellectual domains featuring participation from 350+ colleges across India.

=== Music ===
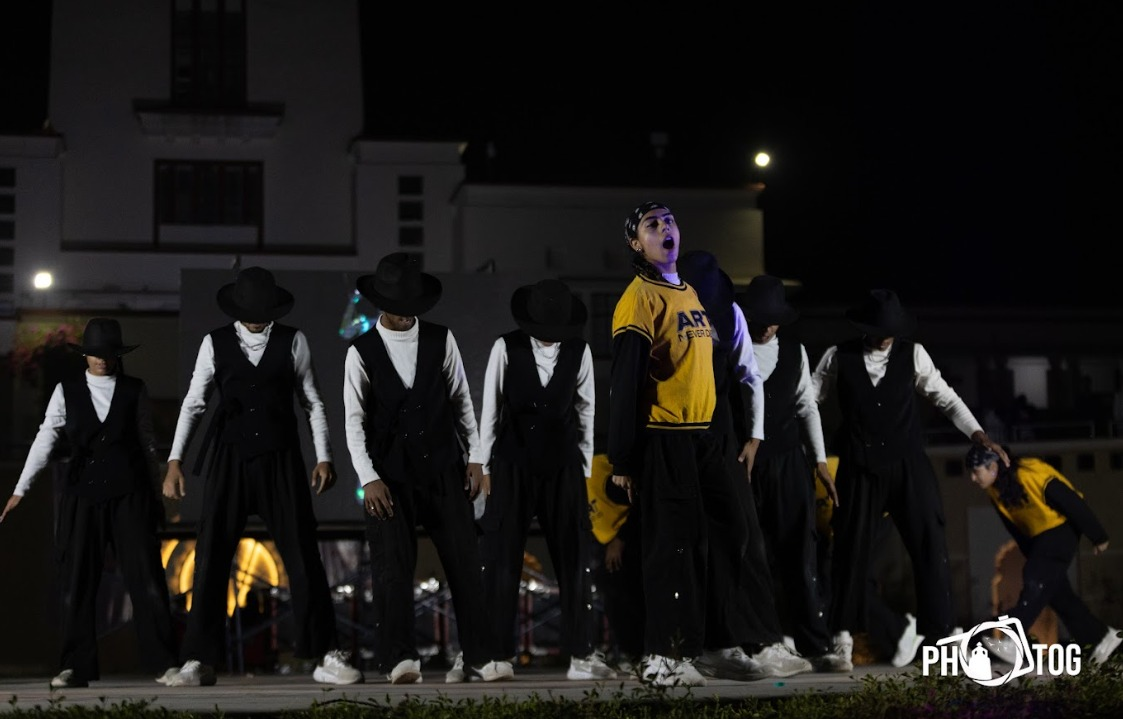
Still from Oasis 2024

Rocktaves was a collegiate rock competition. Preliminary rounds were held in eight cities: Mumbai, Delhi, Kolkata, Bengaluru, Chennai, Kochi, Pune, and Guwahati. Alumni include The Local Train, Parikrama, Indian Ocean, Anand Bhaskar Collective and Euphoria. Rap Wars was a hip-hop contest. Previous participants who have gone on to achieve popularity are Raga, Seedhe Maut, Raftaar and Arpit Bala. Pitch Perfect, Andholika, Tarang, Free Jam, Drums Duel, Axetacy were a series of a cappella, solo vocals, instrumental, percussion, and guitar events.

=== Dance ===
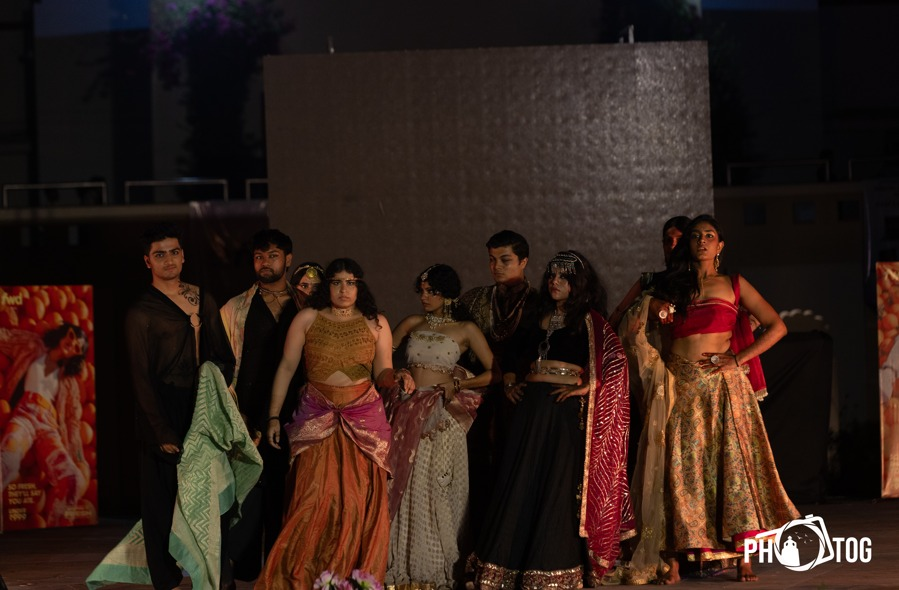
FashP at Rotunda

Dance events include Choreography, Street Dance, Razzmataz, Desert Duel, and Tandav. They range from classical to urban contemporary.

=== Fashion and fine arts ===
FASHP (Fashion Show), Mr. & Mrs. Oasis, Femina Miss India Campus Rounds, Metamorphosis, Splash, and Exposure features such as videography, face painting, and photography contests.

=== Drama and public speaking ===
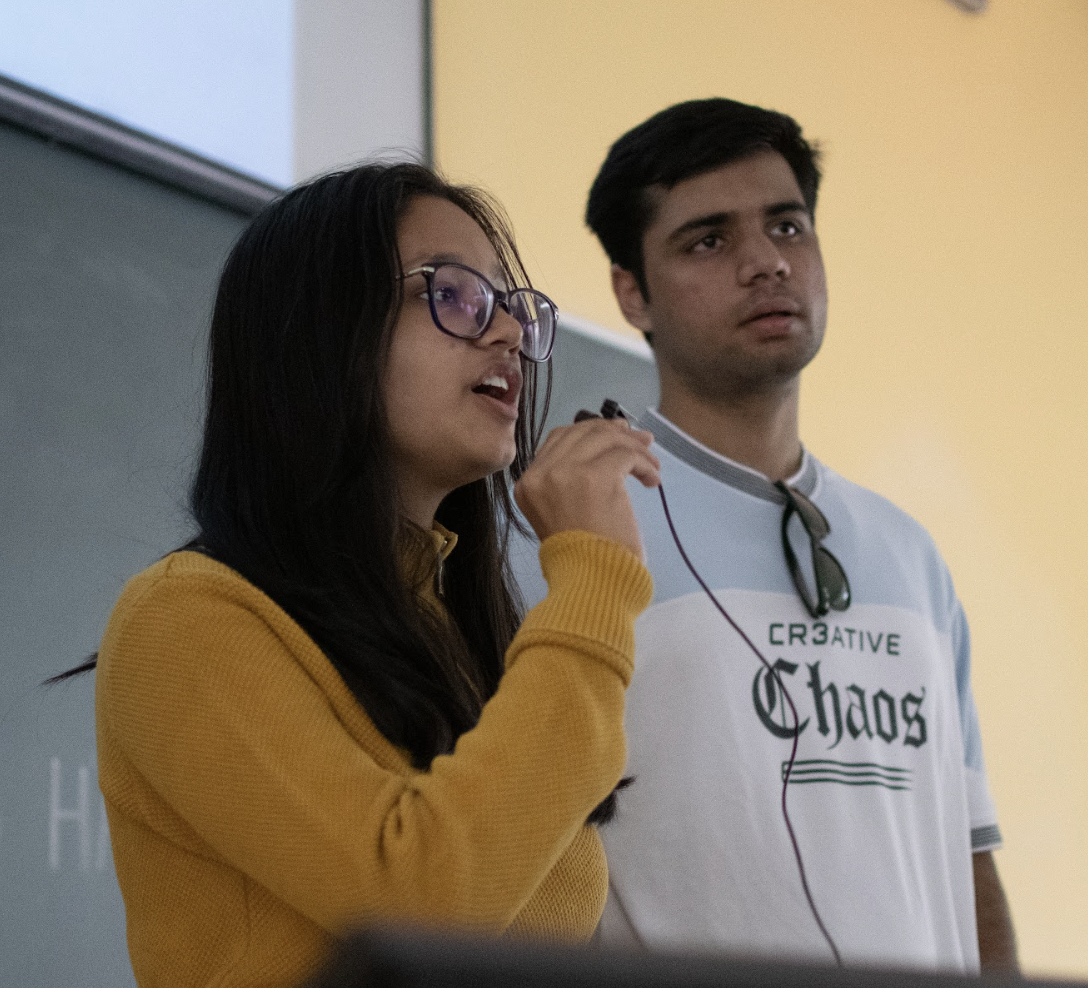
Still from Oasis 2024

Stage Play was a competition featuring full-length dramatic productions. Street Play covered themes of social relevance and encouraged audience interaction. Mock Parliament featured simulated political debate. Oasis Debate tested participants' oratory and argumentative skills.

=== N2O: The Comedy Night ===
N2O is the concluding event of Oasis. It featured popular stand-up comedians such as Vir Das, Zakir Khan, Biswa Kalyan Rath, Kenny Sebastian, Kunal Kamra, and Abish Mathew.

== Professional nights ==
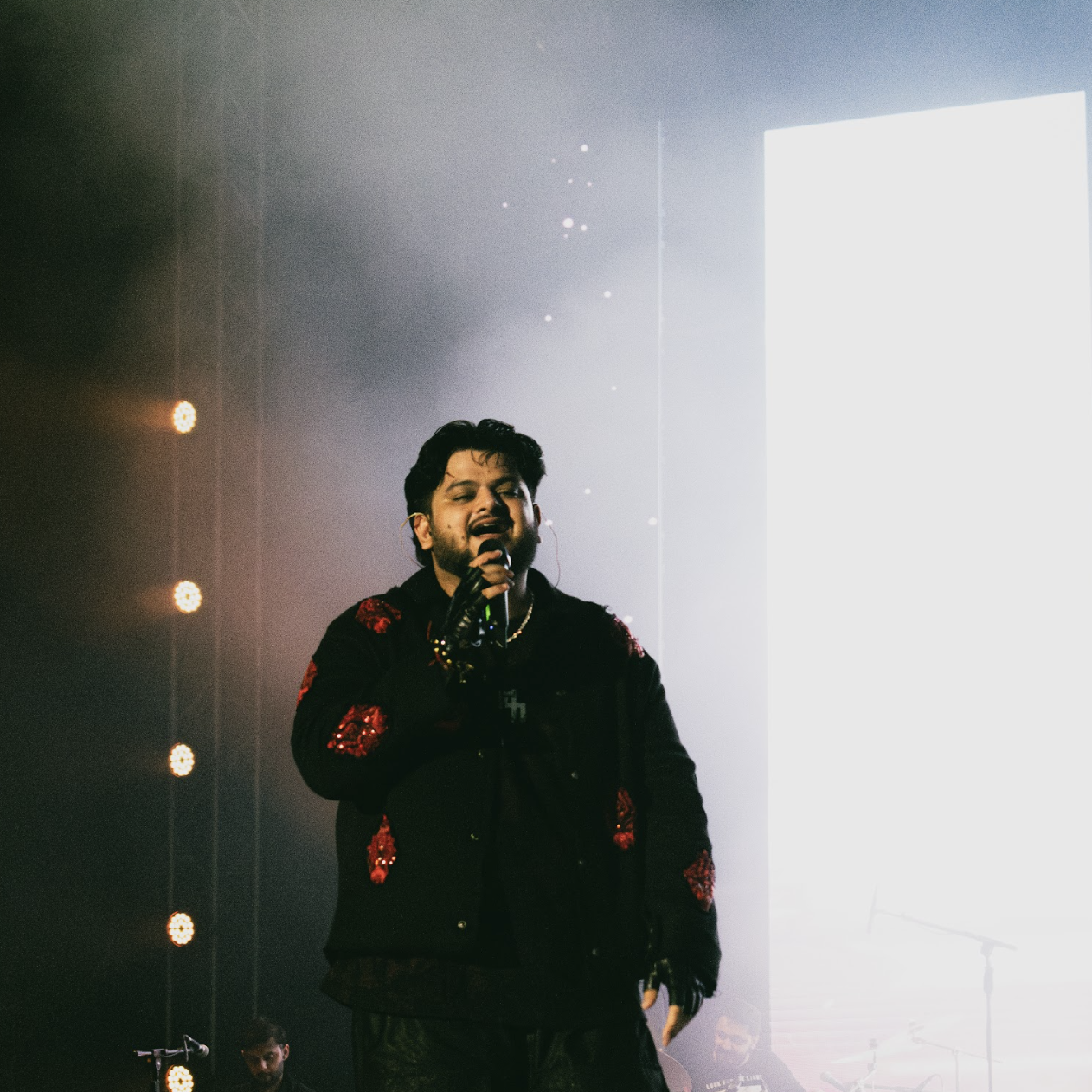
Vishal Mishra at Oasis 2024

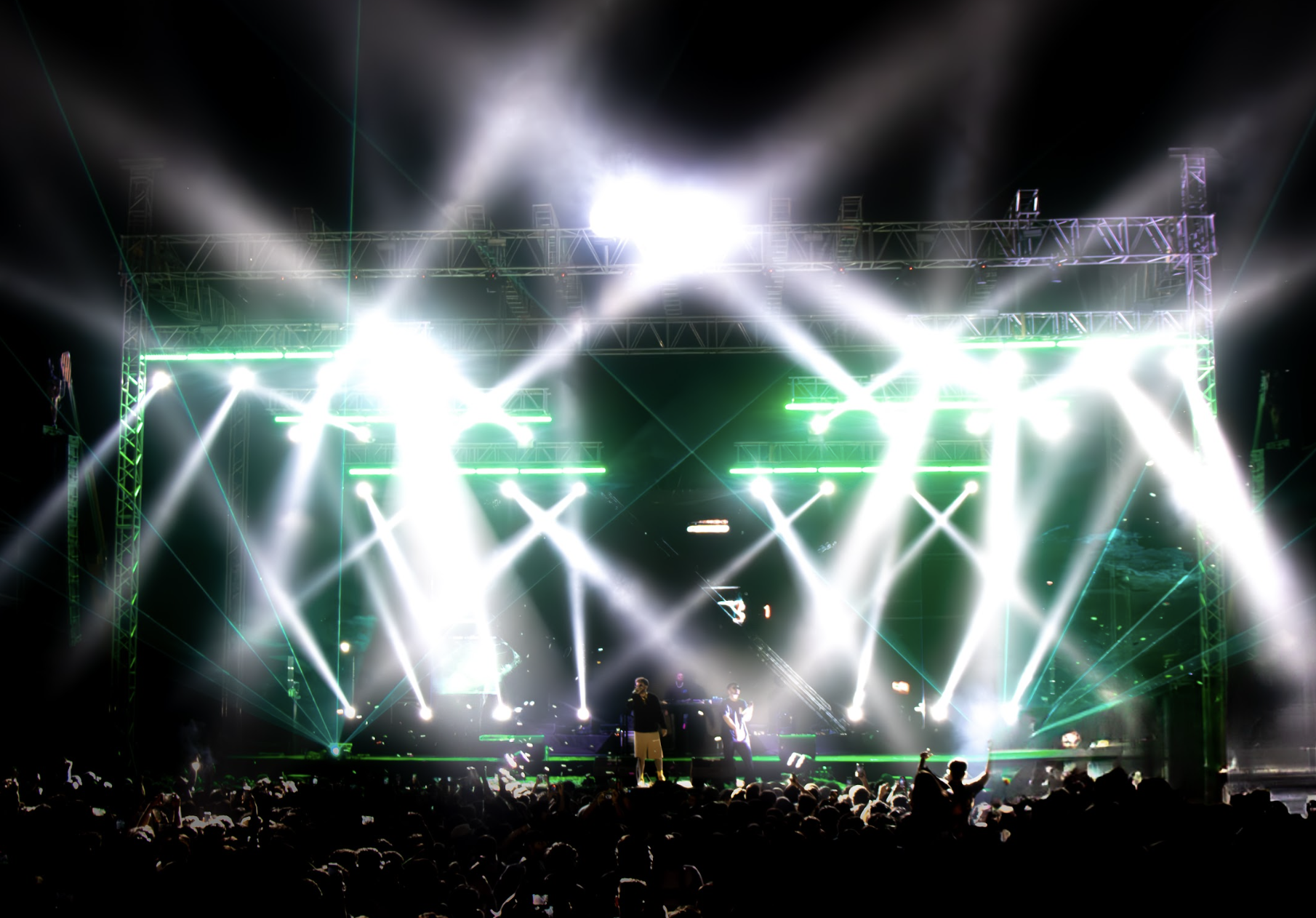
Seedhe Maut at Oasis 2024

=== Bollywood Night ===
The Hindi Prof Show has featured collaborations with Vishal Mishra (2024), Vishal–Shekhar (2023), Amit Trivedi (2022), Farhan Akhtar, Kailash Kher, Lucky Ali, and Shankar–Ehsaan–Loy.

=== EDM & Hip-Hop Night ===
Oasis’s EDM Night has featured DJs such as Nucleya, Seedhe Maut, KRSNA, DJ Shaan, Sevenn, Zaeden, Wolfpack, Arpit Bala, Foosie Gang, Panther, and Smoke.

=== Indie Night ===
Indie Night has featured artists such as Taba Chake, The Yellow Diary, Peter Cat Recording Co., When Chai Met Toast, The Backyard Shrooms, Parvaaz, Dualist Inquiry, The Ganesh Talkies, and Submarine in Space.

== Organization ==
Oasis is organized by the Students' Council for Cultural Activities, including the General Secretary and the President of the Students' Union.

=== Major departments ===
- Art, Design and Publicity
- Reception and Accommodation
- Department of Control
- Publications and Correspondence
- Department of Visual Media

=== Minor departments ===
- Department of Firewallz
- Department of Live Events
- Department of Photography
- Informalz
- Lights
- Sounds
- Audi Force
- Backstage
- Department of Theatre
- Sponsorship and Marketing

== Sponsorships and collaborations ==
Oasis receives corporate and media sponsorship from:

- Companies: OnePlus, Kotak Mahindra Bank, Airtel, Red Bull, BYJU'S, Infosys, Cognizant, Lenovo, Cisco, Myntra
- Media: NDTV Good Times, Channel V, ABP Live, Amar Ujala, 91.1 FM Radio City, Blogadda.com, Youth Incorporated, The Indian Music Diaries
