= Jio Institute =

Higher education institution in India

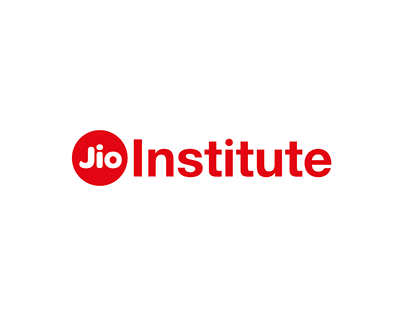
- Type: Private
- Established: 2018
- Founders: Nita Ambani; Mukesh Ambani
- Chancellor: Dr. Raghunath A. Mashelkar
- Vice-Chancellor: Dr. Dipak C. Jain
- Dean: Dr. Shailesh Kumar
- Location: NMSEZ Building 1, Sector 5, Ulwe, Navi Mumbai, Maharashtra 410206, Navi Mumbai, Maharashtra, India
- Campus: Urban
- Website: www.jioinstitute.edu.in

Jio Institute is a private institute of higher education based in India. It was founded in 2018 by Reliance Industries Limited, one of the largest conglomerates in India

== History ==
Jio Institute was founded in 2018 and is based in Navi Mumbai, Maharashtra. The institute is sited on 800 acres (320 hectares) of land. The Ministry of Education, issued a Letter of intent to Jio Institute for setting up an 'Institutes of Eminence' under greenfield category which was followed by criticism. The campus of Jio Institute is currently under construction in Karjat, Maharashtra. The institute is expected to be completed by 2023, and will include research centers, libraries, and sports facilities.

== Academics ==
Jio Institute plans to offer undergraduate, postgraduate, and doctoral programs in various fields such as engineering, humanities, and social sciences.
