= V. Ramgopal Rao =

Indian academic (born 1965)

Valipe Ramgopal Rao
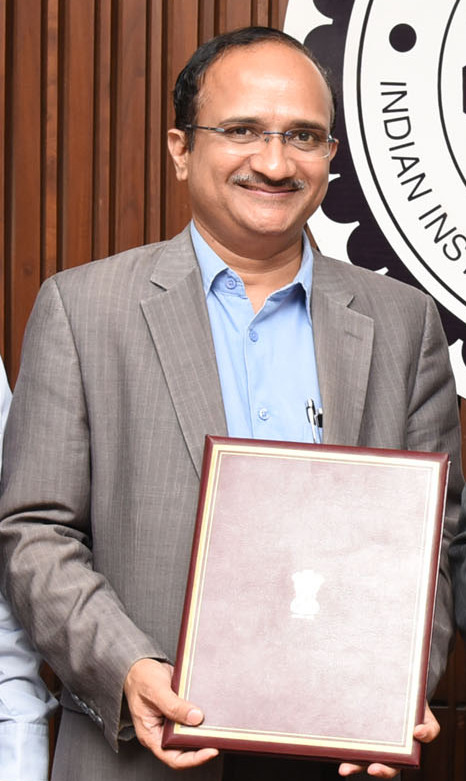
- Born: 16 August 1965 (age 61); Kollapur, Telangana, India
- Education: Kakatiya University (BTech); IIT Bombay (MTech); University of the Bundeswehr Munich (PhD)
- Occupations: Academic, Scientist
- Employer: Birla Institute of Technology and Science, Pilani
- Known for: Former Director, IIT Delhi; Nanoelectronics research
- Title: Vice Chancellor, BITS Pilani
- Awards: Infosys Prize (2013); Shanti Swarup Bhatnagar Prize (2005); Swarnajayanti Fellowship (2003)
- Website: Official Homepage

Valipe Ramgopal Rao (born 16 August 1965) is an Indian academic who has been serving as the Vice Chancellor of the BITS Pilani since 2023. He also serves as the Chairperson of NIFTEM-K and the JNCASR since 2021. He previously served as the Director of the IIT Delhi from 2016 to 2021.

He is the recipient of over 40 honors and awards in the country and abroad including the prestigious Shanti Swarup Bhatnagar Prize, Infosys Prize, Swarnajayanti Fellowship among others. Rao is a Fellow of IEEE, a Fellow of The World Academy of Sciences (TWAS), a Fellow of the Indian National Academy of Engineering (INAE), Indian Academy of Sciences (IASc), National Academy of Sciences (NASI) and the Indian National Science Academy (INSA).

== Early life and education ==
Rao was born in the village of Kollapur in Telangana. He completed his school and intermediate education in Kollapur, studying entirely in the Telugu medium. He obtained his B.Tech degree in Electronics and Instrumentation from Kakatiya University in 1986 with distinction, followed by an M.Tech from IIT Bombay in 1991. He earned a doctorate in Nanoelectronics from the University of the Bundeswehr Munich, Germany, in 1997, completing the program in just two years. He then worked as a Post-doctoral Fellow at the University of California, Los Angeles from 1997 to 1998.

== Academic leadership ==
During his tenure as Director, IIT Delhi saw significant institutional developments. The institute was granted the Institution of Eminence (IoE) status by the Government of India in 2018, making it one of the first three public institutions to receive this recognition.

In 2019, under his leadership, IIT Delhi launched its Global Alumni Endowment Fund, inaugurated by the President of India with an initial commitment of ₹265 crore. This was the first institutional endowment fund of its kind in India and was later recommended as a model by the Ministry of Education for adoption by other educational institutions.

== Research career ==
Rao served as the Professor in the Department of Electrical Engineering at IIT Bombay, where he was a faculty member for 18 years. He has authored over 500 publications and holds more than 50 patents in the fields of electron devices and nanoelectronics.

He was the first elected chairman of the Indian Section of the American Nano Society. Rao also held short-term visiting positions at several institutions globally, including the University of California, Los Angeles (2001), Tokyo Institute of Technology, Monash University, University of Calabria, Georgia Institute of Technology, Nanyang Technological University, University of Alberta, and McGill University.

He also served as Editor of the IEEE Transactions on Electron Devices from 2003 to 2012. He was the Head of the Centre for Nanotechnology and Science at IIT Bombay from December 2005 to January 2007, and held the P. K. Kelkar Chair Professorship in Nanotechnology before his appointment as Director at IIT Delhi.

Since 2023, he has served as the Group Vice Chancellor of the Birla Institute of Technology and Science (BITS Pilani), overseeing its campuses in Pilani, Goa, Hyderabad, Dubai, and Mumbai. Additionally, he also serves as the Chancellor of the Jawaharlal Nehru Centre for Advanced Scientific Research (JNCASR) and the Chairperson of the National Institute of Food Technology Entrepreneurship and Management (NIFTEM).

== Awards and accolades ==
V. Ramgopal Rao is a Fellow of the IEEE (elected in 2017 "for his contributions to CMOS System-on-Chip technologies"), the Indian National Science Academy (INSA), the Indian Academy of Sciences (IASc), the National Academy of Sciences (NASI), the Indian National Academy of Engineering (INAE), the Institution of Electronics and Telecommunication Engineers (IETE), and an invited member of the Society for Cancer Research and Communication. He has received numerous national and international honors for his pioneering work in nanoelectronics, engineering innovation, and education. His research has been widely recognized for its scientific excellence, translational impact, and contribution to national development.

- Infosys Prize for Engineering and Computer Science (2013).
- Shanti Swarup Bhatnagar Prize in Engineering Sciences (2005).
- Swarnajayanti Fellowship (2003), awarded by the Department of Science and Technology, Government of India.
- J. C. Bose National Fellowship (2015).
- IBM Faculty Award (2007).
- H. H. Mathur Award for Excellence in Research in Applied Sciences, IIT Bombay (2012).
- IEEE Electron Device Society Education Award (2020) for "educational leadership and establishing Nanoelectronics research programs in India”.
- Prof. C. N. R. Rao Bangalore INDIA NANO Science Award (2016).
- DRDO Academic Excellence Award (2017), awarded by the Minister of Defence, Government of India.
- Telangana State Award for Science & Technology (2016), awarded by the Chief Minister on Telangana Formation Day.
- NASI–Reliance Industries Platinum Jubilee Award for Application Oriented Research in Physical Sciences (2014).
- DAE–SRC Outstanding Research Investigator Award (2010), Department of Atomic Energy–Science Research Council, Government of India.
- Indian Semiconductor Association TechnoMentor Award (2009).
- IIT Bombay "Industrial Impact Award" (2008), for research with maximum industry impact.
- VASVIK Award (2016) in Information & Communications Technology.
- MRSI–ICSC Superconductivity & Materials Science Prize (2008), presented by Dr. R. A. Mashelkar at the 19th MRSI AGM.
- Best Research Paper Award at the Global Interposer Technology (GIT) Workshop, Georgia Tech, USA (2011).
