= Rocktaves =

Rocktaves^{1} is a semi-professional rock festival organised in India at the university level. Held every year in BITS Pilani during its annual cultural fest Oasis, it has served as a platform for upcoming Indian bands, launching many bands to fame. Bands like Parikrama, Indian Ocean, Prestorika, and Euphoria have risen to fame after winning Rocktaves. In 2008, Lounge Piranha, a rock band from Bangalore promoted their new album during Rocktaves.

The event is usually scheduled to start at around midnight, but starts early in the dawn and ends in the morning.
