= Arun K. Somani =

Indian Professor of Electrical and Computer Engineering

Arun K. Somani is Senior Associate Dean for Research of College of Engineering, Distinguished Professor of Electrical and Computer Engineering and Philip and Virginia Sproul Professor at Iowa State University. Somani is an IEEE Fellow for "contributions to theory and applications of computer networks" from 1999 to 2017 and Life Fellow of IEEE since 2018. He is an ACM Distinguished Engineer and AAAS Fellow.

== Education ==
Somani received a B.E. (Hons.) degree in Electronics Engineering from Birla Institute of Technology and Science, Pilani in 1973, an M.Tech. in Computer Engineering from Indian Institute of Technology Delhi in 1979 and an MSEE in Electrical Engineering from McGill University in 1983.

== Career ==
In 1985, after completing his Ph.D. at McGill University, he joined the faculty of Electrical & Computer Engineering Department at University of Washington, serving as assistant professor from 1985 to 1990, associate professor from 1990 to 1995 and professor till 1997.

In 1997, he joined the Electrical and Computer Engineering Department at Iowa State University. He served as David C. Nicholas Professor of Electrical and Computer Engineering from 1997 to 2002, Jerry R. Junkins Endowed Chair Professor of Electrical and Computer Engineering from 2002 to 2014, Director of Information Infrastructure Institute from 2002 to 2015 and Chair of Electrical and Computer Engineering Department from 2003 to 2010. He is serving as Anson Marston Distinguished Professor since 2007, Associate Dean for Research of College of Engineering since 2013 and Philip and Virginia Sproul Professor since 2014, all at Iowa State University.

During 2010–2011, Somani served as Ram Rajindra Malhotra Professor at Indian Institute of Technology. He also served as an honorary distinguished professor at National Taiwan University of Science and Technology (Taiwan Tech) since 2010 and a visiting professor at Gujarat Technological University. Professor Somani also served as a Fulbright Specialist from 2019 to 2024.

== Early life and family ==
Arun Somani was raised by Dulari Somani and Kanwarlal Somani in Beawar, India, and attended Government Patel Higher Secondary School before pursuing his engineering degrees and joining the workforce. His education was partially supported by a National Scholarship in India and Canadian Commonwealth Scholarship. He and his wife, Manju Somani, raised three children - Ashutosh, Paritosh, and Anju.

== Contributions ==
System-Level Diagnosis is a field of study in which computing units can be utilized to test each other to locate faulty units. Somani developed a generalized theory for system-level diagnosis in the presence of an arbitrary fault set in a multi-computer system. He characterized diagnosable systems in terms of their testing requirement under various model of test result interpretation and faults scenarios where faults occur sequentially or simultaneously. He also developed distributed fault diagnosis algorithms for applications in multi-processor systems that exploit the regularity and symmetry of interconnection topology to diagnose larger sized fault sets correctly with a very high probability.

In fault tolerant computer system architecture area, Somani developed MESHKIN, a new fault tolerant computer system architecture based on distributed fault diagnosis and reconfiguration approach to tolerate multiple faults and maintain high reliability while minimizing the hardware complexity and performance penalty for the Boeing company implemented. The Boeing company implemented a fault tolerant computer system based on this work.

Analyzing highly reliable systems is a complex process. The primary reason for the complexity is because these systems operate in multiple phases with different requirements and follow involute maintenance schedules. Hierarchical Modelling and Analysis Package (HIMAP) developed for the Boeing Company by Somani facilitate such complex system analysis. HIMAP has also been used by other companies and universities.

Most parallel computing is performed using cluster computing today. Somani designed and implemented a fully reconfigurable high-performance system, Proteus, for computer vision applications in 1990's that allows overlapping of computation and communication to minimize communication penalty and optimize performance. This system used a large grain message passing network model at high level and shared memory multiprocessor node at the lowest level with software-controlled cache coherency and optimization in cache design.

The Proteus design utilized universal interconnection topologies Enhanced Hypercube (EHC), Generalized Folding Cube (GFC), and Helical Binary-cube (HBC) for embedding any arbitrary permutation routing requests in circuit switched mode.

Wavelength-division multiplexing (WDM)-based Fiber-optics form the basis of today backbone network and wavelength conversion is considered a performance improving concept. Somani's research group characterized the role of wavelength converters in optical WDM network and showed the concept is most valuable only in a class of networks. His research also developed efficient algorithms for placement of converters and then focused on a practical and cost-effective solution leading to development of alternate architecture that employs no wavelength conversion and uses multiple fiber with fewer wavelengths on each fiber. Several efficient mechanisms for traffic grooming architectures, algorithms, and frameworks for resource allocation of efficient traffic grooming also resulted from this research.

In high-speed network such as WDM-based optical network, fiber failures are not only common, but also have disastrous effects. Somani's research led to development of dependable routing and connection management method, attack detection and diagnosis techniques in WDM-based fiber-optic networks, and effectiveness study of these techniques.

Dependability of computer systems in the presence of transient and soft faults is a major concern in processor and memory system designs. Somani studied the error propagation characteristics due to transient faults in processor registers, logic, and cache memories and developed low-overhead techniques to enhance system robustness. The shadow caching for multi-bit error correction in cache memory system, and circuit and logic level error detection and correction in processor systems. Most applications running under a given operating environment do not exert the critical path every cycle, leaving room for significant performance improvements that can be achieved through dynamically adjusting clock frequency at run time beyond worst case limits. To improve both the performance and reliability of processor systems, Somani developed a design methodology to overcome the clock rates upper bound that is determined using the worst-case timing paths to avoid timing errors.

== Works ==
- Somani, A. K.; Shekhawat, Rajveer Singh; Mundra, Ankit; Srivastava, Sumit (2019). Smart Systems and Iot: Innovations in Computing: Proceeding of Ssic 2019. Springer. ISBN 978-9811384059.
- Somani, A. K. (2017). Proceedings of First International Conference on Smart System, Innovations and Computing: Ssic 2017, Jaipur, India. Springer. ISBN 978-9811058271.
- Somani, A. K.; Deka, Chandra Ganesh (2017). Big Data Analysis: Tools and Technology for Effective Planning. Chapman and Hall/CRC. ISBN 978-1138032392.
- Somani, A. K. (2006). Survivability and Traffic Grooming in Optical Networks. Cambridge Press Book. ISBN 0521853885.
- Somani, A. K.; Mundra, Ankit; Doss, Robin; Bhattacharya, Subhajit (Eds.) (2021). Smart Systems: Innovations in Computing, Proceeding of SSIC 2021. Springer. ISBN 978-981-16-2876-4.
