= Autar Kaw =

Professor of mechanical engineering at University of South Florida

- Born: 1960 (age 65–66)
- Known for: Engineering Education
- Awards: U.S. Professor of Year (2012); ASEE National Outstanding Teaching Award (2011); ASEE Ralph Coats Roe Award (2018); SAE Ralph-Teetor Award (1991)

Academic background
- Education: Ph. D.
- Alma mater: BITS Pilani; Clemson University

Academic work
- Discipline: Mechanical Engineering
- Institutions: University of South Florida
- Website: http://AutarKaw.com

Autar Kaw is a professor of mechanical engineering at the University of South Florida. In 2012, he won the U.S Professor of the Year award from the Carnegie Foundation for Advancement of Teaching and the Council for Advancement and Support of Education. Kaw's main scholarly interests are in education research methods, open courseware development, flipped and adaptive learning, and the state and future of higher education.

== Education ==
In 1981, Kaw completed BE Honors in Mechanical Engineering from the Birla Institute of Technology and Science (BITS) in India. He joined Clemson University for MS and Ph.D. in Engineering Mechanics.

== Career ==
In 1987, he joined the University of South Florida. Since 2002, the National Science Foundation, a United States government agency, funded the development and implementation of an open courseware in Numerical Methods under the leadership of Kaw. The open courseware receives 1.8 million view on YouTube annually. He is the author of various books.

He is a Fellow of the American Society of Mechanical Engineers. He is a member of American Society of Engineering Education and National Academy of Inventors He is one of the two founding members of the USF College of Engineering Academy of Distinguished Engineering Educators. In 2018, he visited UTP, Malaysia as a Fulbright Specialist candidate. He conducted several educational workshops on topics including MOOCs, flipped learning, improving student classroom performance, and the scholarship of teaching and learning.

== Awards ==
Year	Award	Notes
2018	Ralph Coats Roe Award	American Society of Engineering Education
2012	U.S Professor of the Year	
2011	National Outstanding Teaching Award	American Society of Engineering Education
2004	Florida U.S. Professor of the Year	
2003	Archie Higdon Distinguished Educator Award	American Society of Engineering Education
