= BOSM =

Annual sports festival of Birla Institute of Technology and Science, Pilani campus

BITS Open Sports Meet (BOSM)
- Status: Active
- Genre: Sports Festival
- Dates: September
- Frequency: Annual
- Venue: BITS Pilani, Pilani campus
- Locations: Pilani, Rajasthan, India
- Years active: 1986–present
- Attendance: 150 colleges
- Organizer: Committee of Students for Sports Activities (CoSSAc), BITS Pilani
- Website: http://www.bitsbosm.org/

BITS Open Sports Meet (BOSM) is the annual sports festival of Birla Institute of Technology and Science, Pilani campus. This sports meet, usually held around mid-September is a prominent showcase of sporting talents from around the country.

BOSM is a student-managed sports festival aimed at providing a platform for colleges from across India to compete.

== History ==
BOSM was started back in 1986 when it was a one-day event with the organization done by the institute itself. After a few years, it was set up as a student-run non-profit organization. It is now a four-day festival encompassing everything about sports and witnessing a footfall of over 10,000 students. It is also the only college festival in the country to have an official mascot, Baxter. Several notable personalities have graced the opening ceremony of BOSM, some of whom are : Dinesh Mongia, Rajyavardhan Singh Rathore, Saba Karim, Akhil Kumar and Krishna Poonia among others.

== Events ==
=== Sports events ===
The major sports events held during the fest are:

Sport	Boys	Girls
Athletics	•	•
Badminton	•	•
Basketball	•	•
Bodybuilding	•	-
Carrom	•	•
Chess	•	•
Cricket	•	-
Football	•	-
Frisbee	*	*
Hockey	•	-
Volleyball	•	•
Squash	•	•
Swimming	•	•
Table Tennis	•	•
Tennis	•	•
Taekwondo	•	-
Power lifting	•	-

=== Informal Events ===
BOSM not only brings sporting events but also comes up with events like prof shows, exhibitions, talks, and more. Some of them are:

- Pre-BOSM quizzes and talks
- N2O - Comedy Night
- EDM Night
- Ignition - Gaming Tournament
- Aberration - Photography Competition
- Human Foosball
- Anti-Chess
- Street football
- Angry Birds
- Pac-man
- Laser tag
- Paintball
- Box Cricket
- Tug-Of-War
- Crac-O-Dial

== Organization and Departments Involved ==
BOSM is mainly organized by the Committee of Students for Sports Activities(CoSSAc), a body of eight members which is the fest committee under Sports Union, BITS Pilani. It consists of four delegates from Sports Union viz. the Sports Secretary, three Joint Sports Secretaries who are responsible for coordinating with all stakeholders of BOSM and responsible for all finances, and heads from the following four departments:

- Dept. of Controls
- Dept. of Sponsorship and Marketing
- Dept. of Publications and Correspondence
- Dept. of Reception and Accommodation

who are responsible for works specified for their departments. In addition to the departments listed above, several clubs and minor departments and campus press are involved in the running of the fest. These include Press Clubs, Dept. of Informalz, Firewallz, Photography Club, Creative Activities Club, Gaming Club, Department of Sports Publicity and Design (DSPD) among others.

Among these, the DSPD is responsible for covering all the sporting events that occur during BOSM, and keep the public updated about the result of past matches and the schedule of the upcoming ones through social media handles. They also use these handles to generate publicity for the fest as well.

== Social Cause ==
BOSM is the only sports festival of the country to have a Social Connect. The major events are:

1. Junoon - The major event in this category, Junoon is a Sports cum social event, organized by the Sports Union, BITS Pilani in association with NSS BITS Pilani, for specially abled children. It boasts of over a hundred participants from almost a dozen Non-Government Organisations (like Umang, Greenpeace, Nirmaan, Muskaan, Goonj, Amla Birla Kendra) who battle it out across events ranging from basketball, cricket, football, tennis to cultural competitions. Junoon 2012, the first edition of Junoon was covered by Hindustan Times, New Delhi.
2. BOSM marathon- A ‘run for a cause’ marathon, initiated with the aim to raise awareness about various social issues like women's safety and anti-smoking.
3. YODH- A ‘sports day’ for unprivileged children of the nearby district.
4. Play for a cause- Goodies are given to the needy which translates from the on-field achievements of players.
5. Cleanliness and Tree Plantation Drive

== Sponsors and Past Associates ==
BOSM every year witnesses top brands from various sectors being associated with it. A few notable partners include Buddh International Circuit(BIC), Pepsi, Coca-Cola, Nokia, John Players, Nestle, Pizza Hut, Vodafone, Panasonic and the likes. The media sector has seen several names like The Week, Channel V, NDTV etc.
