= BITS Pilani =

Deemed university in Pilani, Rajasthan, India

Birla Institute of Technology and Science, Pilani
- Former name: Birla College of Engineering (1946–1964)
- Motto: gyānaṁ paramaṁ balam (Sanskrit)
- Motto in English: Knowledge is supreme power
- Type: Private Deemed University
- Established: 1946; 80 years ago (as Birla College of Engineering); 1964; 62 years ago (as BITS Pilani)
- Founder: G. D. Birla
- Affiliations: UGC, NAAC, PCI, AIU, ACU
- Endowment: ₹460 crore (US$49 million) (2026)
- Chancellor: Kumar Mangalam Birla
- Vice-Chancellor: V. Ramgopal Rao
- Director: Sudhirkumar Barai (Pilani campus)
- Academic staff: 1,071; 350 (Pilani campus)
- Students: 15,677; 4,500 (Pilani campus)
- Undergraduates: 11,917
- Postgraduates: 1,634
- Doctoral students: 2,126
- Location: Pilani, Jhunjhunu, Rajasthan, 333031, India; 28°21′49.96″N 75°35′13.26″E
- Campus: 786 acres 328 acres (Pilani campus); Multiple sites
- Colors: Sky blue, red, and yellow
- Nickname: BITSians
- Website: www.bits-pilani.ac.in

The Birla Institute of Technology and Science, Pilani (BITS Pilani) is a private deemed university in Pilani, Rajasthan, India. It focuses primarily on higher education and research in engineering and sciences. BITS Pilani was one of the first six institutes in India to be declared Institutions of Eminence. According to 2012 data, BITS Pilani has an acceptance rate (on-campus) of 1.47%, making it one of the most exclusive technical universities in the world.

The institute was established in its present form in 1964. During this period, the institute's transformation from a regional engineering college to a national university was backed by G.D. Birla. The university has expanded its campuses from Pilani to Dubai, Goa, Hyderabad and Mumbai. Following the establishment of its Dubai campus in 2000, BITS Pilani became the first Indian institute to establish an international campus. It currently comprises five campuses and fifteen academic departments, with a focus on research in science and engineering and an industry-oriented pedagogy to higher education. Backed by the Aditya Birla Group, the institute secures extramural research funds from industries and various government agencies.

Admissions to on-campus programs are solely merit-based and assessed by the entrance examinations conducted by BITS. It is one of the few institutions in India that do not have any reservation policies in their admission criteria.

== History ==
=== Inception ===
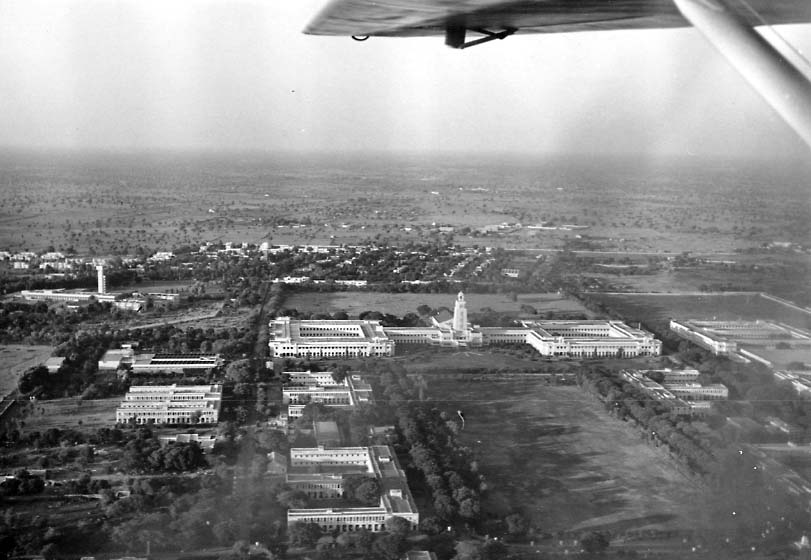
Aerial view, BITS Pilani (1978)

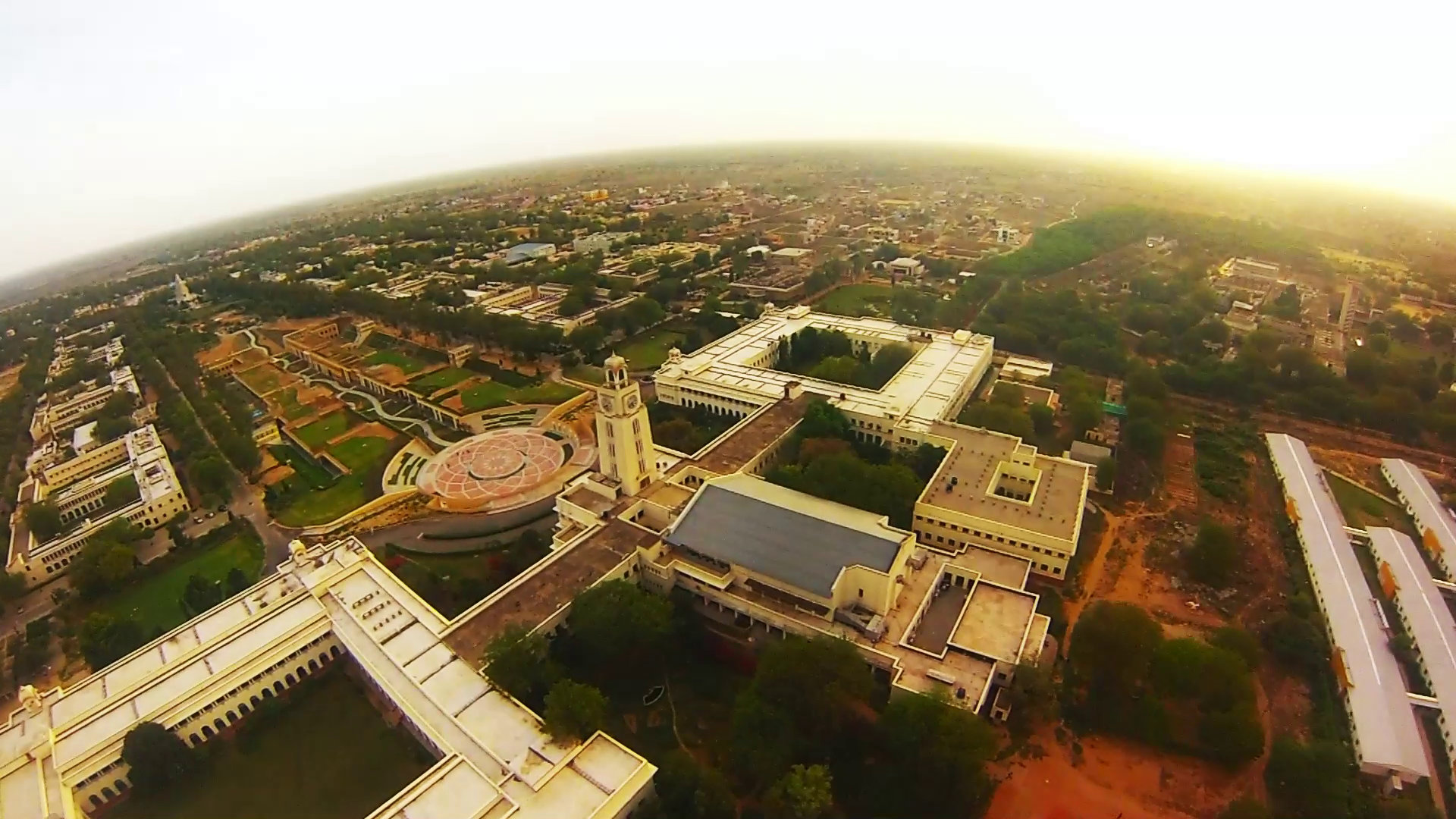
Aerial image of the Pilani campus with the newly inaugurated Rotunda (2014)

Founded in 1929, the Birla Education Trust established an intermediate college, followed by the addition of Science and Pharmacy colleges in 1943 and 1950 respectively. The Birla College of Engineering, offering degree programs in electrical and mechanical engineering was started in 1946. The master's program in electronics was introduced in 1955. In 1964, the Birla Colleges of Science, Engineering and Pharmacy were incorporated to form the Birla Institute of Technology and Science (BITS).

Reacting to early criticism about the project, contemporary advisor Thomas Drew said:

In my judgment to attempt to develop an American institution in India would be like trying to graft apples on a pine tree. We have not been asked to make such an attempt. We were asked to help devise in India an Indian technological school to produce graduates with the know-how to produce knowledge pertinent for India…. In many respects, they consider us immature, rude, hypocritical barbarians who in certain respects happened to hit it lucky. To be viable in India an institution must be framed with Indian values in mind.

BITS Pilani became a deemed university established under Section 3 of the UGC Act, 1956 by notification No. F.12-23/63.U-2 of 18 June 1964. In its formative years, the Institute tied up with the Massachusetts Institute of Technology (MIT), Boston, USA. It adopted a semester system, modular structure of courses, continuous and internal evaluation, letter grading and the likes. It also created linkages with the industries which yielded structured "Practice Schools" as an integral component of education.

The Institute board provided direction in developing a curriculum, selecting equipment, upgrading the library and recruiting (and training) an Indian faculty. To quicken the pace of reform he convinced C. R. Mitra to be the new director of the institute. Mitra advocated a "practice school" internship program as a requirement for faculty and students. The Practice School Program is still a requirement for students in BITS.

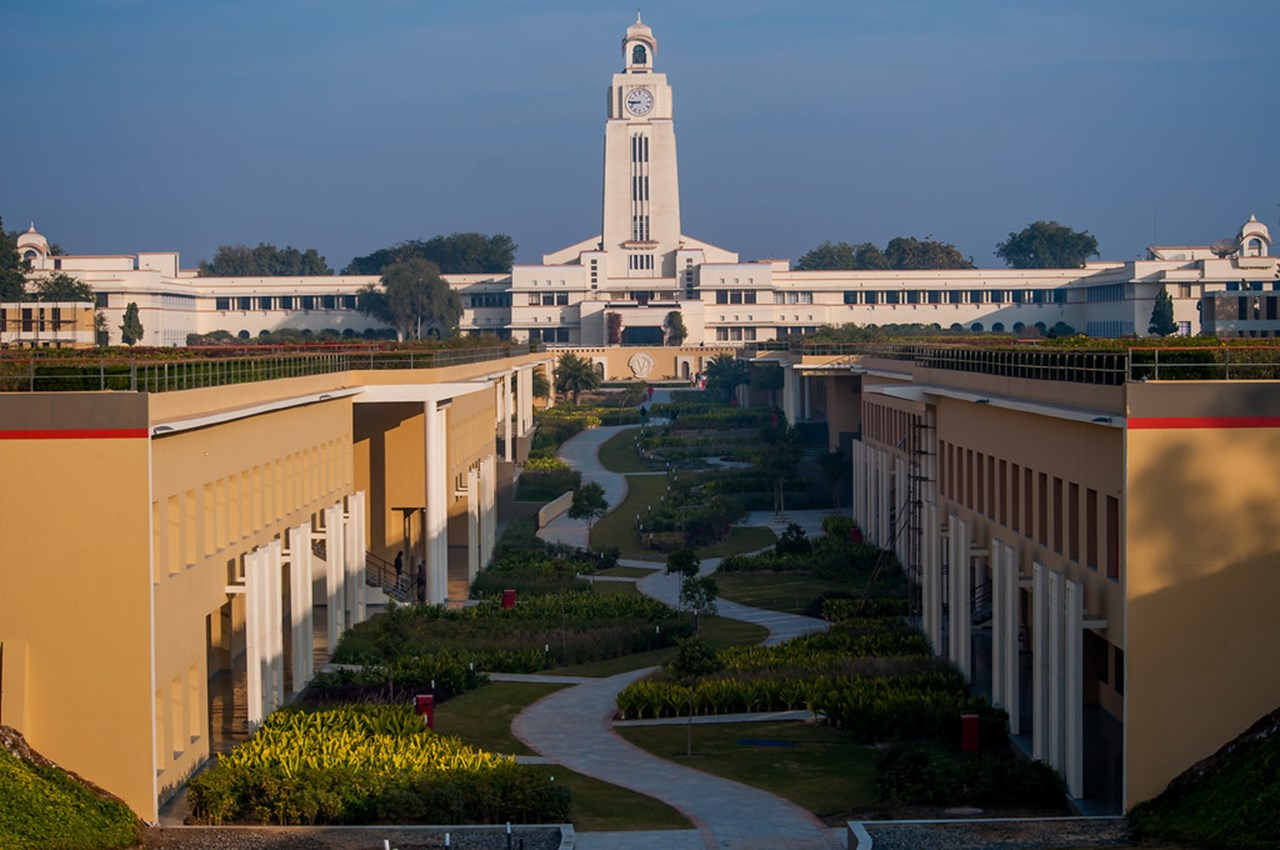
Clock tower, BITS Pilani

According to American historians Robert Kargon and Stuart Leslie:

BITS offered an opportunity to build a leading technological university in India responsive to India's goals, to produce practising engineers who will be in a position to graduate and to build industries in India, under Indian conditions. With its emphasis on the Practice School and ties to Indian industry, it helped educate Indian industrialists along with Indian engineers who would remain in India, in contrast to many other engineering colleges in India, most of whose graduates would leave the country after obtaining their basic engineering education. The Ford Foundation Evaluators...proudly noted that the Indian government, despite having given no direct financial support, was looking to BITS to provide a model for future development in education in engineering and science in India.

Like Berkeley, BITS Pilani has also experienced student activism. BITS Pilani had to be shut down multiple times because of student strikes in 1973, 1980, 1985 and 2017.

=== Multi-campus expansion ===
Campuses within India: Pilani, Goa, Hyderabad, Mumbai

In 1999, enrollment expanded from 2,500 to 4,000 and campuses were founded in Dubai (2000) and Goa (2004). Upon invitation by the Government of Andhra Pradesh, BITS Pilani acquired 200 acres (81 ha) of land from the Andhra Pradesh government through the Hyderabad Urban Development Authority for a new constituent campus in 2006. The land is located in Jawaharnagar, Shamirpet Mandal in the Hyderabad Metropolitan Region. The BITS Pilani Hyderabad campus was opened in 2008.

BITS School of Management (BITSoM) was established in January 2021 and offers a two-year full-time residential MBA program. Alongside BITS Law School (BITSLAW), launched in March 2023, and BITS Design School (BITSDES), launched in February 2024, all three schools initially operated from interim campuses in Mumbai. In 2024, they moved to a newly inaugurated 63-acre permanent campus in Kalyan, within the Mumbai Metropolitan Region.

=== Chancellor and academic head ===
BITS Pilani has a tradition of long-serving chancellors. Its founder, G.D. Birla, was chancellor from the college's inception until his death in 1983. He was followed by his son, Krishna Kumar Birla, who was chancellor until his death in 2008. Currently, Kumar Mangalam Birla is chancellor and Shobhana Bhartia is pro-chancellor.

The first academic head of the institution was J. C. Stracliff (Principal) for a period of 3 years during 1946–1949. V. Lakshminarayan became Principal of Birla Engineering College in 1949 and Director of BITS Pilani in 1964 when it was established (serving until 1969). He was succeeded by the third and fourth academic heads (BITS Pilani Directors) C.R. Mitra (1969–1989) and S. Venkateswaran (1989–2006). L.K. Maheshwari was the fifth academic head, serving as Director as well as Vice Chancellor, the latter terminology denoting the overall head of multiple campuses (each of which now has a Director). The current directors of the campuses are Sudhirkumar Barai, Suman Kundu, Soumyo Mukherji, and Souri Banerjee for Pilani, Goa, Hyderabad, and Dubai campuses, respectively.

In April 2016, Chancellor KM Birla announced that Souvik Bhattacharya of IIT Kharagpur was selected to take over as the new Vice chancellor of BITS Pilani. He took over in June 2016 to become the 6th academic head of the institute. Ranendra N. Saha served as the Acting Vice Chancellor from 13 June 2021 to 30 September 2021 after the expiration of Bhattacharya's term. The latter was re-appointed as the Vice Chancellor from 1 October 2021 for a period of five years. On 10 March 2023, V. Ramgopal Rao took over the Vice Chancellor's office from the outgoing Bhattacharya, becoming the seventh academic head of the institute.

== Campuses ==
=== Pilani Campus ===
Spread across 328 acres (1,330,000 m^{2}), Pilani campus is positioned 200 kilometres (120 mi) west of Delhi and 220 kilometres (140 mi) north of Jaipur. The campus has 11,245 square metres (121,040 sq ft) of classrooms and 7,069 square metres (76,090 sq ft) of laboratories.

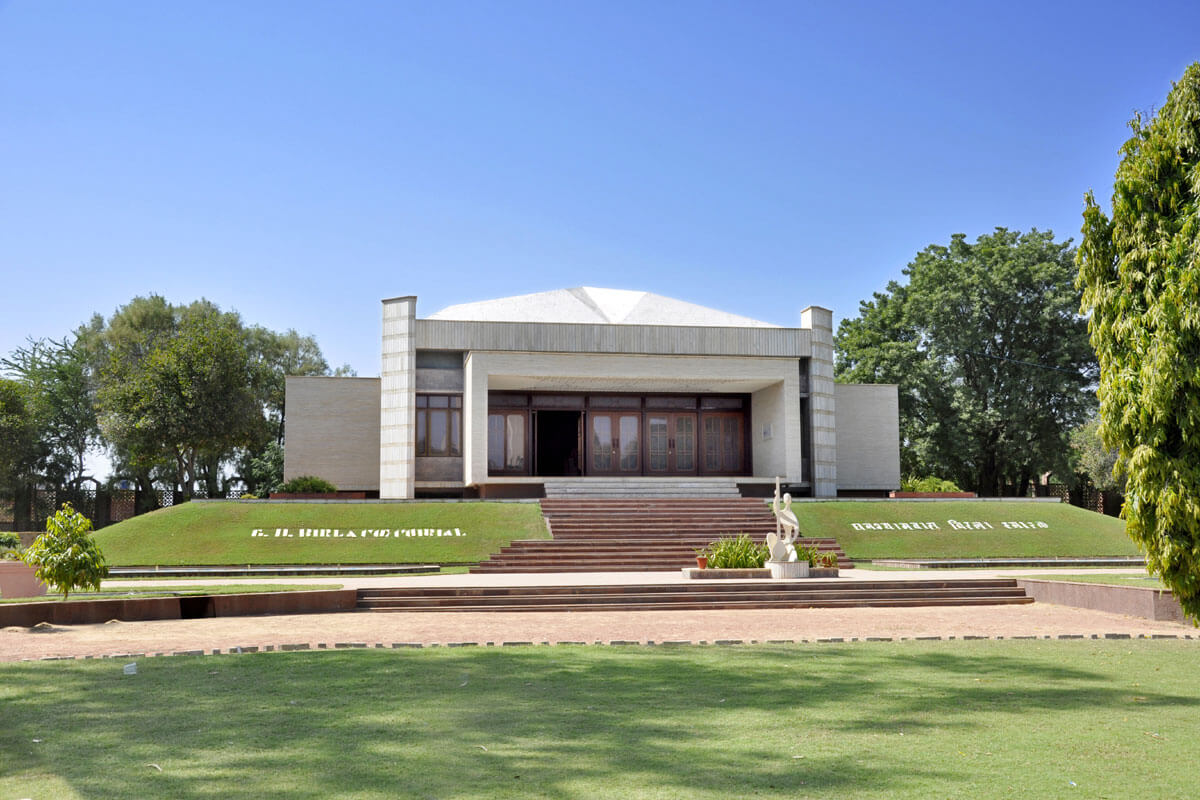
G.D. Birla Memorial

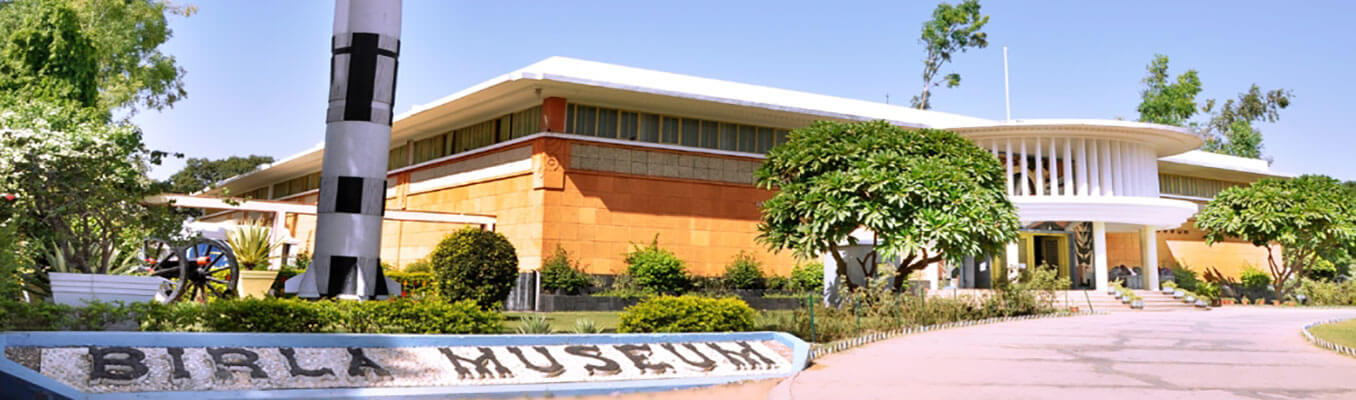
Birla Science Centre, BITS Pilani

The Pilani campus has India's first technological museum, the Birla Museum. Built in 1954, it showcases technological achievements. BITS has a 2,535-square-metre (27,290 sq ft) auditorium decorated with paintings by students from the department of art and decoration.

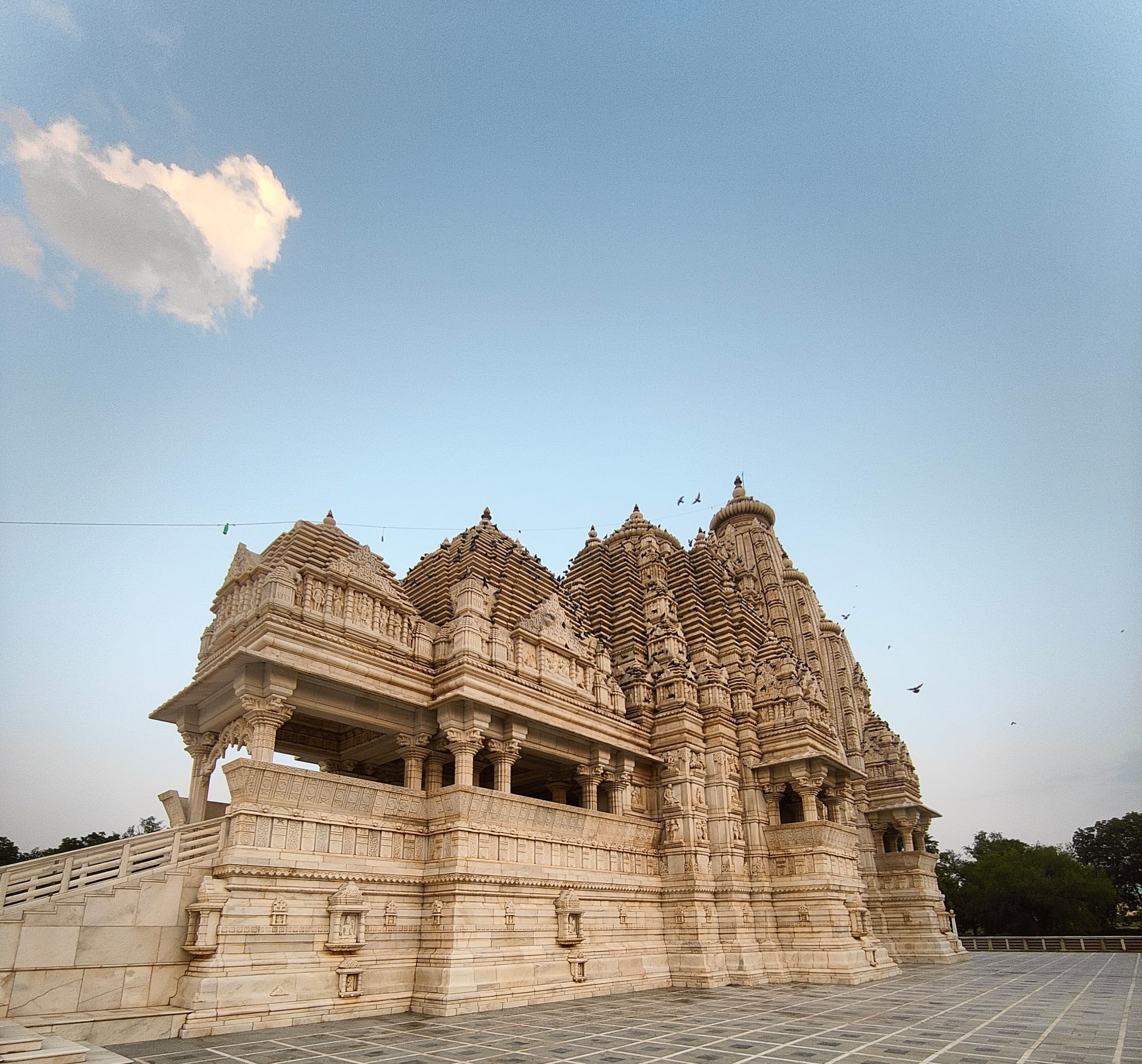
Saraswati temple, BITS Pilani

BITS has a Sharda Peeth dedicated to the goddess Saraswati, Sharda Peeth, built by G. D. Birla. The white marble temple is built on a 7-foot (2.1 m)-high foundation, with 70 pillars for support. It covers an area of 25,000 square feet (2,300 m^{2}).

==== Residential and dining facilities ====
The institute has fourteen hostels in total. Each hostel is referred as a "Bhawan", the Sanskrit word for hostel. Thirteen of them – Krishna Bhawan, Vishwakarma Bhawan, Rana Pratap Bhawan, Bhagirath Bhawan, Ashok Bhawan, Gandhi Bhawan, Shankar Bhawan, Vyas Bhawan, Ram Bhawan, Budh Bhawan, Malviya Bhawan, Sir CV Raman Bhavan and Srinivasa Ramanujan Bhawan, are for male students. Meera Bhawan is the only hostel complex for female students. The hostels are named after saints, scientists, and historical and religious figures. The institute also has a hostel for parents and guests.

Every two hostels share a mess hall except Meera Bhawan, Srinivasa Ramanujan Bhawan and Sir CV Raman Bhawan, which have their own mess halls. All dining areas are student-managed. Students may also eat at a "Redi" (a small kiosk near every hostel), Institute Canteen (IC), the All-Night Canteen (ANC), Food Ministry (FM), and the Student Activity Centre (SAC) cafeteria (301 °F, Looters, and Domino's). The ANC is also student-managed. Moreover, there is a small area inside campus called "Connaught Place" which has many restaurants, cafes, and shops for general daily needs as well.

==== Vision 2020, Mission 2012 ====
In 2010 the institute launched a renewal project, "Vision 2020, Mission 2012," to identify and implement measures establishing BITS Pilani as one of India's top three research-led universities by 2015 and among the leading 25 technical universities in Asia by 2020. As a part of this initiative, Kumar Mangalam Birla visited the Pilani campus on 13 November 2011 with pro-chancellor Shobhana Bhartia and other members of the board of governors. At this meeting, Birla announced a ₹600 crore fund for renovation and construction of new academic buildings and student hostels on the Pilani campus. The project was planned for completion in 2014.

==== Project Vistaar ====
In July 2025, BITS Pilani announced Project Vistaar, a ₹2,200 crore expansion—the largest investment in its history. The initiative includes a new campus in Amaravati and a ₹1,219 crore upgrade of existing campuses in Pilani, Goa, and Hyderabad. The announcement was made by Chancellor Kumar Mangalam Birla during the institute’s convocation ceremony.

In October 2026, BITS Pilani announced the appointment of Mohan Krishnamoorthy as the founding director of its upcoming Amaravati campus, effective January 2027. The Amaravati campus will serve as a hub for advanced programs in AI, machine learning, innovation, and strategy. Developed in two phases, it will accommodate over 7,000 students and offer global collaborations, doctoral programs, and sustainable infrastructure.

== Academics ==
=== Academic programmes (On-campus) ===
==== Integrated first degrees ====
BITS Pilani offers four-year integrated first-degree programs in engineering and pharmacy, and integrated Master of Science programs in science and technology. The Dual-Degree program allows students to pursue two degrees, namely a Master's in Science (M.Sc.) and a Bachelor's in Engineering (B.E.) simultaneously for a time duration of five-years. The dual-degree program is part of the first-degree programs and is offered to students on the basis of BITSAT scores.

==== Higher degrees ====
BITS Pilani offers two-year higher-degree programs in engineering, pharmacy and business administration. The Master of Engineering (M.E.) program is offered to students on the basis of GATE scores and BITS HD exam scores.

Doctoral degrees

BITS Pilani offers Ph.D. programs in Engineering, Sciences, Pharmacy, Social Sciences, and Management across its campuses. Admission is based on a written test and interview, with exemptions for candidates holding higher degrees (M.Phil./M.E.) or national-level fellowships like CSIR NET-JRF, DBT-JRF, or UGC NET-JRF.

=== Admission ===
==== Pilani, Goa and Hyderabad campuses ====
Before 2005, admissions were based on the candidates' score in the 12th board examination. BITS had been moderating marks from various school boards since 1982.

Since 2005, admission to first-degree in BITS has been offered on the basis of the student's performance in the all-India entrance examination, the Birla Institute of Technology and Science Admission Test (BITSAT). BITSAT, for which applications are submitted in December, is conducted online in May and June in cities all over India. The exam tests the candidate's knowledge, reasoning and analytical abilities in physics, chemistry, mathematics, English and logical reasoning, and is based on higher secondary curricula in India and abroad. A 2012 news report showed that BITSAT had become more competitive than the IIT-JEE, in terms of the ratio of the number of aspirants to the number of seats available.

Admission to on-campus higher degrees such as Master's in Engineering (M.E.) is done on the basis of GATE scores and BITS HD (Higher Degree) examination scores.

For foreign students, BITS has a separate admission scheme called International Student Admissions (ISA) category. To gauge the merit of these ISA students, BITS accepts the SAT and SAT Subject Tests in chemistry, physics, and Math 2C.

==== Dubai campus ====
Admission to Birla Institute of Technology and Science, Pilani – Dubai Campus is based on scores in the 12th standard qualifying exam along with BITSAT. Although the BITS Pilani-Dubai campus was established for the educational requirements of the Gulf Cooperation Council countries, admission is open to students of all nationalities.

=== Academic and industrial collaborations ===
BITS Pilani collaborates extensively with industries and government organizations, including the DST, ICMR, DBT, ISRO, DRDO and DAE. The institute actively promotes innovation and supports ventures by faculty, students, and alumni through its incubation programs. BITS is a partner in developing the JournalServer open-access digital library, Project IPV6 and the MIT iCampus initiative. BITS Pilani has signed key MoUs with institutions such as the Indian Institute of Science (IISc), Tata Institute of Fundamental Research (TIFR) and IIT Bombay for joint research and specialized courses. The One Health Trust, in collaboration with BITS, has a joint research program in Data Sciences for Global Health, focusing on research training, fieldwork, and data analysis. BITS Pilani has signed MoUs with the University of Southern California, University at Buffalo, Iowa State University, Rensselaer Polytechnic Institute in USA, CentraleSupélec in France and Royal Melbourne Institute of Technology (RMIT) in Australia for dual degree programmes and research initiatives.

=== Research facilities ===
BITS Pilani hosts a range of advanced research facilities across its campuses, supporting interdisciplinary research and innovation in science and engineering. The Central Instrumentation Facility (CIF) at each campus provides centralized access to high-end scientific equipment. Other specialized facilities includes a state-of-the-art cleanroom for micro and nano-fabrication, the Nalini Kurra Wind Tunnel Facility for advanced research in aerodynamic and renewable energy, the MEMS, Microfluidics & Nanoelectronics Lab (MMNE Lab) and Intracellular Parasite Education and Research Labs (iPEARL), a BSL-2+ facility for infectious disease research.

BITS Pilani also hosts dedicated Centres of Excellence, including the Centre for Artificial Intelligence Research (APPCAIR), Centre of Research Excellence in Semiconductor Technologies (CREST), Centre of Research Excellence in National Security (CRENS), and the Advanced Research Centre for Sustainable Energy Technologies (ARCSET), which focus on key national and global research priorities. The institute was awarded the Sophisticated Analytical and Technical Help Institute (SATHI) project by the Department of Science and Technology (DST), a grant of ₹60 crore to set up shared research infrastructure in areas such as material sciences, device manufacturing and biopharmaceuticals. BITS Pilani is the only self-financed institute selected to host a Technology Innovation Hub under the Bio–Cyber Physical Systems (Bio‑CPS) vertical, through the BITS BioCyTiH Foundation, with a grant of ₹125 crore. According to the Nature Index 2026, BITS Pilani is ranked 19th among the academic institutions in India in terms of research output.

=== Distance learning programmes (WILP) ===
BITS Pilani also offers online distance learning programmes such as Work Integrated Learning Programmes (WILP), enabling working professionals to pursue B.Tech., M.Tech., diploma, and certificate programmes while continuing to work in industry.

=== Digital education programmes ===
BITS Pilani launched its first online undergraduate degree, the B.Sc. in Computer Science, in September 2022 through a partnership with Coursera. The programme offers flexible pacing and multiple exit options. In 2025, BITS Pilani established BITS Pilani Digital as a dedicated platform to expand its online degree offerings. The initial offerings include Bachelors and Masters in Data Science & AI.

=== Rankings ===
University and college rankings

General – international
- QS (World) (2025): 668
- QS (Asia) (2024): 171

General – India
- NIRF (Overall) (2024): 23
- NIRF (Research) (2024): 26
- NIRF (Universities) (2024): 19

Engineering – India
- NIRF (2024): 20
- India Today (2024): 7
- Outlook India (2024): 2

Pharmacy – India
- NIRF (2024): 3

Internationally, BITS Pilani was ranked 575 in the QS World University Rankings for 2027 and 154 in Asia. In India, in the 2025 National Institutional Ranking Framework (NIRF) rankings, BITS Pilani was ranked 16 overall, 7 among universities, 11 in the engineering ranking, and 2 in the pharmacy ranking. It was ranked 7th among engineering colleges by India Today in 2025 and second among private engineering colleges by Outlook India in 2025.

The Department of Management at the Pilani campus is ranked among the top 25 B-Schools in India, according to The WEEK-Hansa Research Best B-Schools Survey 2025, and falls within the 401–450 band globally in the QS Business & Management Subject Ranking 2026.

== Student activities ==
=== Events ===
==== Oasis ====
Oasis is the annual cultural festival of the BITS, Pilani. It hosts a variety of events in various categories like dance, drama, literature, comedy, fashion and music (such as Rocktaves).

==== BOSM ====
BOSM (BITS Open Sports Meet) is the annual sports competition at the Pilani campus. BITS Pilani invites colleges throughout India to participate in events including carrom board, hockey, cricket, basketball, football, volleyball, track and field, badminton, tennis, table tennis, squash and weightlifting. Since its 2010 silver jubilee (25th) anniversary, BOSM has invited a team from Moratuwa University in Sri Lanka.

==== APOGEE ====
APOGEE (A Professions Oriented Gathering over Educational Experiences) is an international annual technical festival at the Pilani campus. Since its inception in 1983, APOGEE has hosted students and researchers from across the country. The guest lecture series of the fest, Think Again Conclave has received eminent speakers in the past which include A.P.J. Abdul Kalam, Richard Stallman, Jimmy Wales, Kailash Satyarthi, Walter Lewin and A. S. Kiran Kumar. Other events include the Paper Presentation Event, which is one of the oldest research paper presentation platforms in the country, and Project Presentation, which exhibits over 550 projects in various fields of science and engineering.

=== Spark ===
The BITS Spark programme was launched in 2012. The programme promotes entrepreneurship courses and workshops, offers mentorship, and provides angel funds.

== Notable alumni ==
- Sanjay Mehrotra, co-founder of Sandisk and CEO of Micron Technology
- Preetish Nijhawan, co-founder of Akamai Technologies
- Prateek Suri, founder of Maser Group
- Baba Kalyani, businessman and chairman of Bharat Forge
- Sabeer Bhatia, co-founder of Hotmail, first free web-based email service
- Revathi Advaithi, CEO of Flex
- Rakesh Kapoor, former CEO of Reckitt Benckiser
- Sunil Duggal, former CEO of Dabur
- Goverdhan Mehta, Padma Shri Awardee, ex-Director of IISc Bangalore and ex-Vice Chancellor of University of Hyderabad
- S. P. Kothari, Padma Shri Awardee, Dean of MIT Sloan School of Management
- Milind Tambe, Gordon McKay Professor of Computer Science at Harvard University
- Autar Kaw, Professor of Mechanical Engineering at the University of South Florida
- Arun K. Somani, department chair and Senior Associate Dean in Engineering, Iowa State University
- Narendra Ahuja, Founding Director of IIIT Hyderabad (1999–2002) and Donald B. Willett Professor Emeritus in Engineering at the University of Illinois at Urbana–Champaign
- Govindan Rangarajan, mathematician, Director of Indian Institute of Science, Bangalore
- V. S. Subrahmanian, Walter P. Murphy Professor of Computer Science at Northwestern University
- C. V. Ananda Bose, former Governor of West Bengal
- Prithviraj Chavan, former Chief Minister of Maharashtra; former Union Minister for Science and Technology, Govt. of India
- Anu Hasan, Tamil actress and TV show host
- Kaniha, Malayalam/Tamil movie actress and TV show host
- Harish Sivaramakrishnan, Playback singer, Composer, Carnatic musician, Engineer, Head of design in CRED
- Reena Aggarwal, Robert E. McDonough Professor of Finance, Georgetown University and Director, Psaros Center for Financial Markets and Policy
