= Swarnajayanti Fellowship =

Indian research award

- Awarded for: Research in basic science in India
- Presented by: Department of Science and Technology (India); Government of India
- First award: 1997
- Website: Swarnajayanti Fellowship Website

The Swarnajayanti Fellowship (SJ) is a research fellowship in India awarded annually by the Department of Science and Technology (India) for notable and outstanding research by young scientists, applied or fundamental, in biology, chemistry, environmental science, engineering, mathematics, medicine and physics. The prize recognizes promising young Indian academicians who are producing outstanding work that impacts research and development.

== Details ==
Citizens of India who are under 40 years of age, and have a proven track record may apply. The fellowship consists of an additional monthly stipend of ₹25,000 (equivalent to ₹32,000 or US$340 in 2026) as well as a research grant of ₹5 lakh (US$5,300) per annum. The fellowship also requires that candidates have employment support from an Indian Institute of their choosing.

== Prizes ==
The prize is divided into six disciplines, namely:

- Chemical Sciences
- Earth and Atmospheric Sciences
- Engineering Sciences
- Mathematical Sciences
- Life Science
- Physical Sciences

== Recipients ==
- List of Swarnajayanti Fellows

== See also ==
- List of general science and technology awards
