= Motivate Media Group =

Motivate Media Group (previously known as Motivate Publishing) is a media company based in Dubai, United Arab Emirates. It was founded in 1979 by Ian Fairservice, and today has offices in Abu Dhabi (the capital of the UAE) Saudi, and London. It is operated in partnership between Ian Fairservice and Obaid Al Tayer, who is the chairman of the Al Tayer Group and the UAE’s former Minister of State for Finance.

== History ==
The company was established with the launch of Whats On, the first English language magazine in the Persian Gulf region. The magazine’s primary readership was budding tourists and the UAE’s expat community. Today, Motivate Media Group publishes a variety of magazines, including Emirates Woman, Gulf Business, Campaign Middle East, and Business Traveller Middle East.

Motivate Media Group publishes books on topics related to the Middle East under its Books Arabia division. The company has published books by authors including Sheikh Mohammed bin Rashid Al Maktoum, Wilfred Thesiger, and Yusuf Islam (Cat Stevens).

== Divisions and partnerships ==
Motivate Val Morgan was formed in 1989, and is a joint venture between Val Morgan Cinema Network (a division of Hoyts). It offers advertising in cinemas across the UAE, Lebanon, Oman, Egypt and Saudi Arabia (through MUVI Cinemas).

Motivate VAMP (which is a regional partnership of Vamp Brands) helps put advertising clients in touch with social media influencers.

Motivate Media Group also hosts the Dubai Lynx International Advertising Festival and Awards, an advertising and marketing event held in partnership with the Cannes Lions International Advertising Festival.

== Publications ==
- What's On (Dubai and Abu Dhabi): A guide to UAE entertainment, restaurants, and events.
- Emirates Woman: A monthly woman’s lifestyle magazine.
- Gulf Business: Monthly magazine that covers various business sectors in the GCC.
- Identity: Architecture, design and interiors magazine.
- Campaign Middle East: The regional version of the advertising and media magazine. It is licensed from Haymarket Media Group.
- Business Traveller: Magazine based on the business travel industry. Licensed from London’s Panacea Media Group.
- Golf Digest Middle East: The Middle Easter edition of Discovery, Inc.'s golf and lifestyle magazine. Previously, it was owned and operated by Condé Nast.
