= Gulf Business =

Emirati business magazine

- Categories: Business; News
- Frequency: Monthly
- Publisher: Motivate Media Group
- Founded: 1996
- Country: United Arab Emirates
- Language: English
- Website: gulfbusiness.com

Gulf Business is a leading business media brand based in Dubai, United Arab Emirates, covering regional economic news, corporate developments, and market analysis across the Gulf Cooperation Council (GCC) region. It operates as a monthly print magazine and a daily online news platform serving decision-makers, corporate leaders and high-ranking officials.

Gulf Business is published by Motivate Media Group, a Dubai-based media company with a portfolio of magazines, digital platforms, events and content services across the Middle East.

== Gulf Business Awards ==
The magazine organizes the annual Gulf Business Awards.

== See also ==
- Arabian Business
