= Chittaranjan Mitra =

Chittaranjan Mitra चित्तरंजन मित्रा
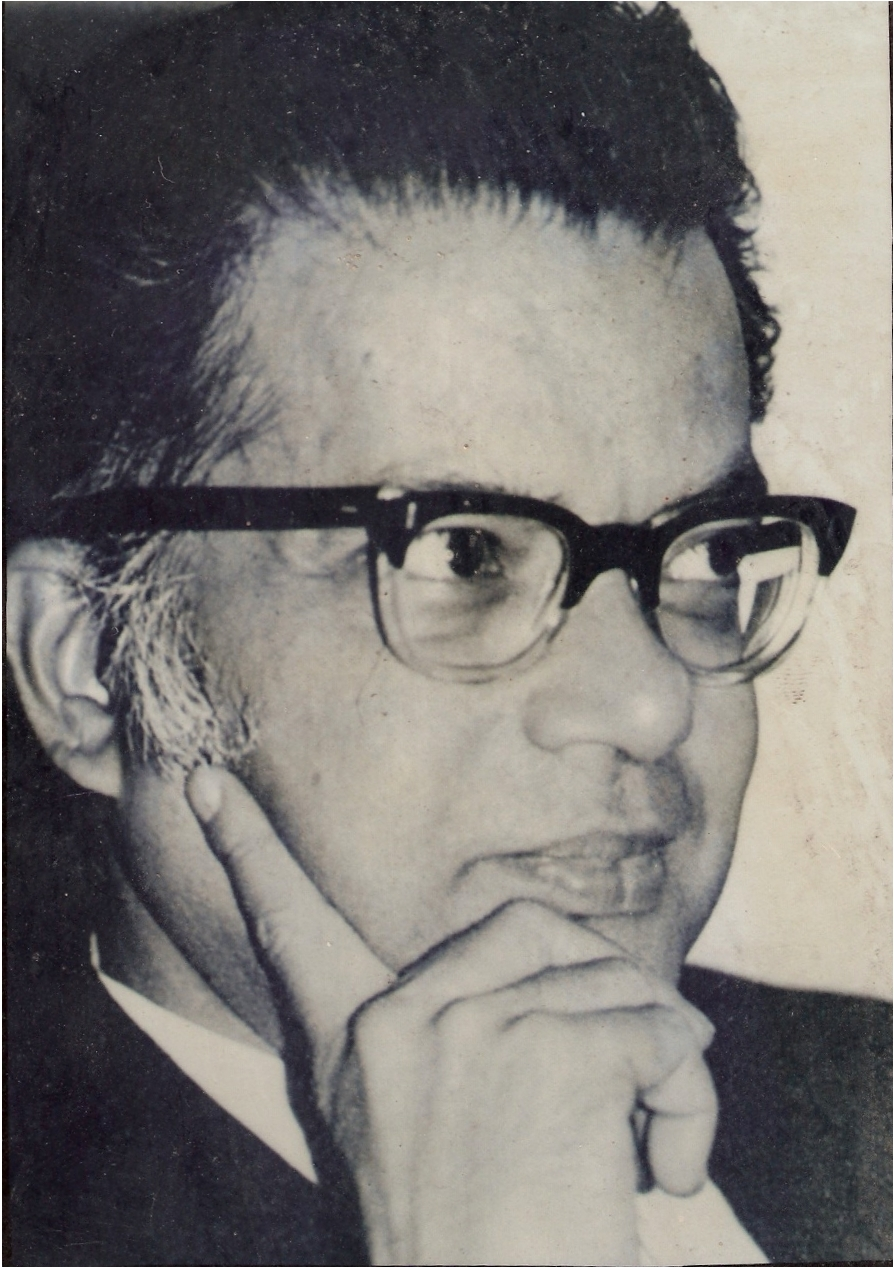
- Born: 13 February 1926; Allahabad,
- Died: 27 August 2008 (aged 82); New Delhi, India
- Education: Allahabad University; Indian Institute of Science; Massachusetts Institute of Technology; Columbia University
- Scientific career
- Workplaces: HBTI; BITS Pilani; NIIT

Chittaranjan Mitra, popularly known as CR Mitra and CRM, was an Indian scientist who is best remembered as the second Director of the Birla Institute of Technology and Science Pilani (BITS). He played a pivotal role in the transformation of the institute from a local engineering college to a reputed university.

== Education ==
Born in 1926 in Allahabad, C.R. Mitra studied at Allahabad University, Indian Institute of Science, Bangalore, did his master's degree at the Massachusetts Institute of Technology and then acquired a Doctorate in Engineering Science from Columbia University, New York.

== Career ==
Returning to India in the 1960s, Mitra first became the director of the Harcourt Butler Technological Institute. In 1969, he was offered the position of director of BITS Pilani by Ghanshyam Das Birla. At this time, the institute was undergoing major changes under the leadership of a committee of experts from MIT. He is credited with increasing the pace of those reforms, as well as for constituting a "practice school" program of industry internship "far more ambitious than anything MIT had done, as a requirement for all faculty and students". To address the human resource development needs of the Indian industry and the financial challenge of running higher degree programs at BITS Pilani, in the year 1979, he pioneered the Work Integrated Learning Programs, which provided education and training to employees of Indian Industries. Today, these programs have an enrollment of about 17,000 students throughout India and are responsible for earning two thirds of the revenue of the institute.

Mitra was responsible for introducing innovative educational philosophies which made the educational system at BITS Pilani unique, including broad-based, multi-disciplinary approach, semester long course based curricula, practice school, industry-academia collaboration, choosing electives and many other features which were firsts in Indian higher education. He was widely respected by the students who affectionately referred to him as Dynamic Diro (Director).

In 1989, he was invited by NIIT to be their education advisor. He was responsible for introducing the 'GNIIT' program that would become the flagship offering of the institute.
