= Institutions of Eminence =

Group of higher educational institution in India

- Formation: 2016
- Type: Higher-education recognition scheme
- Region served: Republic of India
- Members: Universities and institutes of higher education
- Budget: ₹18,000.00 crore (US$1.9 billion) (FY2024–25 est.)
- Website: ioe.ugc.ac.in

Institutions of Eminence (IoE) is a recognition status set up in 2017 for higher education institutes in India, by the University Grants Commission. Recognised institutions are granted more autonomy, both administratively and academically, are allowed to open offshore campuses, and enjoy better collaboration opportunities with global universities. The plan encompasses twenty institutions, twelve of which have already been declared Institutes of Eminence as of April 2021. Public institutions are granted up to ₹1,000 crore (equivalent to ₹16 billion or US$160 million in 2026); no funding is awarded to private institutions.

== Incentives ==
The regulatory infrastructure for the Institutes of Eminence (IoE) plan was provided by the University Grants Commission (UGC) through the UGC (Declaration of Government Institutions as Institutions of Eminence) Guidelines, 2017 for public institutions and UGC (Institutions of Eminence Deemed to be Universities) Regulations, 2017 for private deemed to be university institutions. According to these, both categories of institutions are granted more autonomy, both administratively (e.g. setting fees) and academically, and both will enjoy better collaboration opportunities with global universities. Public institutions are also granted up to ₹1,000 crore (equivalent to ₹16 billion or US$160 million in 2026) but no funding is awarded to private institutions.

== History ==
The IoE scheme was first announced in the presentation of the 2016 Union budget of India on 29 February 2016 by the Finance Minister of India, Arun Jaitley. The purpose of the plan was stated as "... to empower Higher Educational Institutions to help them become world class teaching and research institutions". The plan will include twenty institutes, ten private and ten public. The UGC set the guidelines and regulations for IoE in 2017 and set up an Empowered Expert Committee (EEC) which was tasked with the selection of the institutes and later with monitoring them.

The EEC considered 114 applications, 74 from public institutes and 40 from private ones, including institutes which are yet to be established, and in May 2018 shortlisted eight public institutes and three private ones. However, on the principle of giving equal weight to both categories of institutions, only six institutes were recommended by the UGC in July 2018, three from each category, a move which has drawn some criticism. More criticism was drawn to the fact that one of the private institutes recommended, Jio Institute, which was sponsored by Reliance Foundation, does not yet exist. The recommendation of the UGC was accepted by the Ministry of Human Resource Development (MHRD), granting the IoE status to the three public universities and issuing a letter of intent to the three private ones.

In December 2018, the EEC recommended 19 more institutes, completing a list of 15 institutes from each category, allowing for five institutes in each category in a reserve list. These institutes were ranked by the UGC based on QS World University Rankings, in which National Institutional Ranking Framework (NIRF) was used as a tie-breaker for private universities. The resulting 14 institutes, seven in each category, were recommended by the UGC for IoE status in August 2019. This included two public institutes, Anna University and Jadavpur University, which will be considered for IoE status only if the respective state universities will comment to finance half of the investment. For private institutes, since not enough institutes were ranked, one vacant position was granted in the "greenfield" category, which gives the institute three years to operationalise the institution, after which the EEC will consider giving them the IoE status. This move again drew some controversy. In September 2019, the MHRD awarded IoE status to an additional five public institutes, four existing private institutes, and another private institute in the greenfield category. The five private universities were issued a letter of intent to grant them the IoE status, while two more private universities, Shiv Nadar University and O. P. Jindal Global University, required state legislation to end the existing private university status, in order to be declared IoE Deemed Universities.

By October 2020, the first two private universities to be issued the letter of intent, Birla Institute of Technology and Science, Pilani and Manipal Academy of Higher Education, were conferred the IoE status. In the same month, having met the legislation requirements, O. P. Jindal Global University was conferred the IoE status. Shiv Nadar University followed in March 2021.

In January 2021 the Government of India issued further guidelines, allowing IoEs to open offshore campuses.

== List of institutes ==
As of June 2023, the public institutions declared IoE are:

Logo	Name	Location	Date of Notification
	Banaras Hindu University	Varanasi, Uttar Pradesh	17 February 2020
	Indian Institute of Science	Bengaluru, Karnataka	11 October 2018
	Indian Institute of Technology Bombay	Mumbai, Maharashtra	11 October 2018
	Indian Institute of Technology Delhi	New Delhi	11 October 2018
	Indian Institute of Technology Kharagpur	Kharagpur, West Bengal	20 February 2020
	Indian Institute of Technology Madras	Chennai, Tamil Nadu	17 February 2020
	University of Delhi	New Delhi	2 March 2020
	University of Hyderabad	Hyderabad, Telangana	17 February 2020

The private institutions declared IoE are:

Logo	Name	Location	Date of Notification
	Birla Institute of Technology & Science, Pilani	Pilani, Rajasthan	14 October 2020
	Manipal Academy of Higher Education	Manipal, Karnataka	14 October 2020
	O. P. Jindal Global University	Sonipat, Haryana	4 November 2020
	Shiv Nadar University	Greater Noida, Uttar Pradesh	3 August 2022

== See also ==
- Institutes of National Importance, another recognition scheme for higher education in India
- BRICS Universities League, a consortium of leading research universities from BRICS countries
- List of universities in India
