= List of festivals in Indian colleges =

This is a list of annual cultural festivals held in colleges in India. The list consists only of those festivals that already have an article on Wikipedia. Festivals organised by Indian Institutes of Technology (IITs) and National Institutes of Technology (NITs) are listed separately. The list only consists of festivals with a Wikipedia page.

State/UT	Location	Name of college	Festival name	Festival Type	First Held
Assam	Jorhat	Jorhat Institute of Science & Technology	Abeyaantrix	Technical	2011
Assam	Tezpur	Tezpur University	Techxetra	Technical	2008
Delhi	Dwarka	Netaji Subhas University of Technology	Moksha	Cultural	2003
Delhi	Faridabad	Lingaya's University	Zest	Cultural	1998
Delhi	New Delhi	Delhi Technological University	Engifest	Cultural	1974
Delhi	New Delhi	University College of Medical Sciences	Avalanche UCMS	Cultural	
Delhi	Vasant Kunj	Teri University	Retopia	Technical	2010
Goa	Sancoale	BITS Pilani, Goa Campus	Quark	Technical	2006
Goa	Sancoale	BITS Pilani, Goa Campus	Waves	Cultural	2006
Gujarat	Surat	Sardar Vallabhbhai National Institute of Technology	Sparsh	Cultural	1993
Gujarat	Vadodara	Maharaja Sayajirao University of Baroda	Paramarsh	Cultural	2001
Karnataka	Bengaluru	Indian Institute of Management Bangalore	Unmaad	Cultural	1999
Karnataka	Bengaluru	National Law School of India University	Strawberry Fields	Music	1997
Karnataka	Mysore	JSS Science and Technology University	Jayciana	Cultural	1977
Karnataka	Mysore	Mysore Medical College & Research Institute	saMMsCRIthi	Cultural	2000
Maharashtra	Mumbai	Mithibai College	Mithibai Kshitij	Cultural	2007
Maharashtra	Mumbai	R. D. National College	Cutting Chai	Cultural, Media	2007
Maharashtra	Mumbai	St. Xavier's College, Mumbai	Malhar	Cultural	1979
Maharashtra	Nagpur	Visvesvaraya National Institute Of Technology, Nagpur	Aarohi	Cultural	1988
Maharashtra	Pune	Indian Institute of Science Education and Research, Pune	Karavaan	Cultural	2008
Maharashtra	Pune	Symbiosis International University	Sympulse	Cultural	2010
Puducherry	Pondicherry	Jawaharlal Institute of Postgraduate Medical Education & Research	Spandan	Cultural, Literary, Sports	1980
Rajasthan	Pilani	BITS Pilani, Pilani Campus	BOSM (BITS Open Sports Meet)	Sports	1986
Rajasthan	Pilani	BITS Pilani, Pilani Campus	Oasis	Cultural	1971
Telangana	Hyderabad	BITS Pilani, Hyderabad Campus	ATMOS	Technical	2012
Telangana	Hyderabad	BITS Pilani, Hyderabad Campus	Pearl	Cultural	2009
Telangana	Hyderabad	BITS Pilani, Hyderabad Campus	Verba Maximus	Literary	2011
Tamil Nadu	Chennai	Alagappa College of Technology	Kalakrithi	Cultural	1983
Tamil Nadu	Chennai	College of Engineering, Guindy	Techofes	Cultural	1948
Tamil Nadu	Chennai	Kilpauk Medical College	Pradharshini	Cultural	1978
Tamil Nadu	Chennai	Loyola College, Chennai	Down Sterling	Cultural (Defunct)	
Tamil Nadu	Chennai	Madras Institute of Technology	Mitafest	Cultural	
Tamil Nadu	Kattankulathur	SRM Institute of Science and Technology	Milan	Cultural	2008
Tamil Nadu	Vellore	Vellore Institute of Technology (Vellore campus)	Riviera	Cultural	2002
Uttar Pradesh	Lucknow	Indian Institute of Management Lucknow	Manfest-Varchasva	Cultural	1988
West Bengal	Kolkata	Indian Institute of Management Calcutta	Intaglio	Business	1989
West Bengal	Kolkata	Indian Statistical Institute	Integration	Cultural	2000
West Bengal	Kolkata	Meghnad Saha Institute of Technology	Eutopian Euphorians	Cultural	

== See also ==
- List of cultural, technical and sports festivals in IITs and NITs
