= Cultural Festival =

A cultural festival is a celebration of the traditions of a particular people or place.

Cultural Festival may also refer to:

== Africa ==
- Mangaung African Cultural Festival, Bloemfontein, South Africa
- Maragoli Cultural Festival, Kenya
- Morija Arts & Cultural Festival, Morija, Lesotho, Africa

== Asia ==
=== India ===
- Cultural festival (India), organized by colleges in India
- Waves (festival), Birla Institute of Technology and Science, Pilani – Goa Campus, India
- World Cultural Festival, 2016, held New Delhi, India

=== Other Asian countries ===
- Borneo Cultural Festival, Sibu, Sarawak, Malaysia
- Cultural festival (Japan), held by most schools in Japan
- National Cultural Festival, hosted by different cities in Japan
- Qurain Cultural Festival, Kuwait
- Seorak Cultural Festival, in Sokcho city, Gangwon Province, South Korea
- Uyghur Doppa Cultural Festival, for Uyghur people living in Xinjiang Uyghur Autonomous Region, China

== North America ==
- Adäka Cultural Festival, Whitehorse, Yukon, Canada
- Harlem Cultural Festival, Manhattan, New York City, U.S.
- Scotiabank Caribbean Cultural Festival, Toronto, Canada

== See also ==
- Cultural Exchanges festival, at De Montfort University, Leicester, England
- List of festivals in Indian colleges
- List of cultural, technical and sports festivals in IITs and NITs, a list of cultural and technical festivals held in IITs and NITs in India
