= Jayciana =

Annual cultural festival

- Genre: Cultural festival
- Locations: Mysuru, India
- Founded: 1977
- Filing status: Student-run, non-profit organization
- Sponsor: Sri Jayachamarajendra College of Engineering

Jayciana is the annual cultural festival of the JSS Science and Technology University. The festival, located in Mysuru, is usually held during the months of April and May.

In 2016, Jayciana hosted the maiden performance of West Indian cricketer Dwayne John Bravo, singer Benny Dayal, tabla band Beat Gurus, and artiste V. Brodha. Jayciana 2014 featured the maiden performance of Romanian dance pop act Akcent, Sandalwood actor Vijay Raghavendra as part of the jury of a dance competition, music by Shankar Mahadevan and his troupe, a showcase of their ethnic collection, and judge appearance by Prasad Bidapa for a fashion contest. Sandalwood theater actor Dhananjay, then a student at SJCE, participated in dramatics and folk dance events. Sandalwood actor, filmmaker, and television presenter Ramesh Arvind participated and won prizes as an engineering student in Jayciana.

== History ==
Jayciana was founded in 1977 by the college's student union.

Jayciana 2006 was inaugurated by Rangayana theatre Director Chidambar Rao Jambe; a fusion music performance was given by the troupe Swarathma and 'Swaranjana', a rock band. In 2007, dirt track racing was held for both four-wheelers and two-wheelers. The four-wheeler race (categorized by time-speed and distance) covered nearly 100 km of route length, touching the Outer Ring Road of Mysuru, Bogadi, Jayapura, H.D. Kote Road, KRS Road, and back. 2007 Jayciana also featured a performance from Sandalwood actor Prem Kumar.

In 2009, a marathon was held for awareness on road safety; it was won by Sriharsha (Mysore University), Rutvik (Mysore University), Sevant Kumar (SJCE). Jayciana 2010 saw the presence of Indian film actor and former model Diganth, Parsi model and actress from Mumbai Jennifer Kotwal, and the late Kannada film director Sandeep S. Gowda. On 25 April 2010, Parikrama performed in Jayciana. The marathon of 2010 raised awareness of tiger conservation. Jayciana 2011 saw presence of Sandalwood actor Vijaya Raghavendra and other cast members of Kannada movie Sri Vinayaka Geleyara Balaga. It also included a performance by singer-songwriter Raghu Dixit. The 2011 marathon was for awareness on corruption. Upendra appeared at Jayciana in 2011.

Jayciana 2012 included 'Ride for Safety', a Harley-Davidson rally and expo by Bangalore Pandhis that included Sportster, Fatboy, Iron 833, and Street Bob motorcycles. Limca Record holder Amar Sen displayed his sand art skills. A marathon called 'Green Run' was organised for awareness on importance of a clean and green environment. A cycle marathon called 'Jaycycle' was organised for awareness on conserving the earth and fossil fuels, protecting the environment and reducing greenhouse gas emissions, as well as the necessity for staying healthy and fit with regular exercise and to urge more people to take to cycling. People For Animals (PFA), an animal welfare oriented NGO located at Bogadi, Mysuru, was involved in awareness on protecting animals against cruelty and work to bring about a change in attitudes, laws, and lifestyles towards improving conditions for animals.

In Jayciana 2013, specially abled Aalok Jain showcased his talent. The 2014 edition of Jayciana also saw performance by Abhinava Dance Company of Nirupama-Rajendra and the presence of Sriimurali, an Indian actor who works predominantly in Kannada cinema, and Ragini Dvivedi, an Indian film actor and model who appears in South Indian cinema but primarily in Kannada cinema. A cycle marathon, was organised to spread awareness on voting in view of the then upcoming 2014 Lok Sabha elections and also educate people on protecting the environment, which was flagged off by Kannada film director Suni. The marathon under the theme of "Vote and save democracy" served for awareness on democracy and voting.

Jayciana 2015 saw performances by singer Jonita Gandhi, EDM by SUNBURN, and flute player Praveen Godkhindi. In Jayciana 2016, the Cyclothon motto was "One nation. One beautiful city. Let's keep it clean."

Jayciana 2017 saw performances by Vijay Prakash, Shefali Alvares, and Edward Maya; and a guest appearance by Darshan Thoogudeepa.

In Jayciana 2018 performance is expected by Vasishta Simha, Prakriti Kakar, Lost Stories team and Chetas.

== Events ==
Generally, organised events are:

- Sports – chess, kabaddi, cyclothon, marathon, basketball, badminton, table tennis, volleyball, cricket, football, throwball, arm wrestling, tug of war, frisbee, handball, car and bike expo and rally respectively
- Pet show
- Culture and art – dramatics, folk dance, ethnic day, flash mob, rock show, singing, Miss Jayciana, fashion show, skit, photo marathon, mad advertisements, charades, Pictionary, debate, extempore, film music, folk songs, group songs, and orchestra
- Informal – quizzes, paintball, treasure hunt
- Digital – computer gaming, short movie, band wars

== Publicity ==
Jayciana has received coverage in print, digital, and online media like Deccan Herald, The New Indian Express, The Times of India, The Hindu, Star of Mysore, and News 1 ಕನ್ನಡ (News 1 Kannada).

=== Associates, partners, and publicity ===
Eventt sponsors have included:

- Friendly Motors, Mysuru
- Sandesh The Prince
- Samast International
- Pathak Developers Pvt. Ltd
- ನಂದಿನಿ, ಕೆ ಎಂ ಎಫ್ (Nandini K M F)
- Merako Media Pvt. Ltd
- Mysore Socials
- Loyal World
- Windflower Spa
- Sobha Limited
- Cafe Cornucopia
- Chirag ads
- Bailley
- Radisson Blu Plaza Hotel
- News 1 ಕನ್ನಡ (News 1 Kannada)
- DRC Cinemas
- MasthMysore
