= List of cultural, technical and sports festivals in IITs and NITs =

This is a list of cultural and technical festivals held in Indian Institutes of Technology (IITs) and National Institutes of Technology (NITs) throughout India. Some colleges may combine these festivals with sports or other activities, while others may hold separate sports festivals. The list only consists of festivals with a Wikipedia page.

For a list of all festivals in India, see List of cultural festivals in Indian colleges.

== Indian Institutes of Technology (IITs) ==
State/UT	Location	Name of IIT	Cultural festival		Technical festival		Sports festival	
State/UT	Location	Name of IIT	Name	First held	Name	First held	Name	First held
Delhi	New Delhi	IIT Delhi	Rendezvous	1976	Tryst			
Maharashtra	Mumbai	IIT Bombay	Mood Indigo	1971	Techfest	1998	Aavhan	2017
Rajasthan	Jodhpur	IIT Jodhpur	Ignus	2008	Prometeo	2008	Varchas	2008
Uttarakhand	Roorkee	IIT Roorkee	Thomso	1980s	Cognizance	2003	Sangram	
Uttar Pradesh	Varanasi	IIT (BHU) Varanasi	Kashiyatra	1981	Technex		Spardha	
Odisha	Bhubaneswar	IIT Bhubaneswar	Alma Fiesta	2009	Wissenaire	2010	Ashvamedha	
Jharkhand	Dhanbad	IIT (ISM) Dhanbad	Srijan	1977	Concetto		Parakram	
Assam	Guwahati	IIT Guwahati	Alcheringa	1996	Techniche	1999	Spirit	
Uttar Pradesh	Kanpur	IIT Kanpur	Antaragni	1966	Techkriti	1995	Udghosh	2002
West Bengal	Kharagpur	IIT Kharagpur	Spring Fest	1960			Shaurya	
Tamil Nadu	Chennai	IIT Madras	Saarang	1974	Shaastra	2000		
Himachal Pradesh	Mandi	IIT Mandi	Exodia	2012			Rann-neeti	
Bihar	Patna	IIT Patna	Anwesha	2010	Celesta		Infinito	

== National Institutes of Technology (NITs) ==
State/UT	Location	Name of NIT	Cultural Festival		Technical Festival	
State/UT	Location	Name of NIT	Name	First held	Name	First held
West Bengal	Kolkata	IIEST Shibpur	Rebeca	1932	Instruo	2009
Uttar Pradesh	Allahabad	MNNIT Allahabad	Culrav	1986		
Madhya Pradesh	Bhopal	MANIT Bhopal			Technosearch	2003
Kerala	Kozhikode	NIT Calicut	Ragam	1987	Tathva	
Haryana	Kurukshetra	NIT Kurukshetra			Techspardha	1995
Jharkhand	Jamshedpur	NIT Jamshedpur			Ojass	2004
Maharashtra	Nagpur	VNIT Nagpur	Aarohi	1988		
Karnataka	Surathkal	NIT Surathkal	Incident	1980	Engineer	2005
Tamil Nadu	Trichy	NIT Trichy	Festember	1975	Pragyan	2005
Telangana	Warangal	NIT Warangal	SpringSpree	1978		
Sikkim	Ravangla	NIT Sikkim	Udgam	2014	Abhiyantran	2014

== See also ==
- List of cultural festivals in Indian colleges
