= Zest =

Zest may refer to:

== Common usage ==
- Zest (ingredient), the outer peel of a citrus
  - Zester, a tool for preparing zest
  - Twist (cocktail garnish), a piece of zest
- Zest (positive psychology), a component of character
  - Zesty, slang term derived from the above term that is used to describe flamboyance or effeminacy.

== Brands ==
- Zest (brand) bar soap, a High Ridge Brands trademark
- Honda Zest, a car released in 2006 until 2012
- Tata Zest, a car released in 2014 by the Indian company Tata Group

== Media ==
- Zest Of, a 2008 album recorded by French pop singer Zazie
- Zest (magazine), a magazine published by Hearst Magazines UK

== Other uses ==
- Zest (festival), an annual inter-collegiate youth festival, hosted by Lingaya's University in Faridabad, India
- HMS Zest, a destroyer in service during World War II
- Zest Airways, based in the Philippines, the former rebranding of AirAsia Zest
- Empire Zest, a Dutch trawler
- The Zest award, given by Johnson & Wales University for excellence in food preparation
