= Mithibai Kshitij =

Annual inter-collegiate cultural festival of Mithibai College

- Genre: Cultural
- Dates: 8–11 January 2026
- Frequency: Annual
- Venue: JVPD Grounds, Juhu
- Location: Mumbai
- Country: India
- Inaugurated: 2007
- Attendance: 50,000+ (2022)
- Organiser: Student body of Mithibai College
- Website: mithibaikshitij.com

Mithibai Kshitij is the annual inter-collegiate cultural festival of Mithibai College.

== History ==
Mithibai Kshitij is Mithibai college's annual cultural 4-day festival, with more than 700 colleges invited every year. Founded in the year 2007, it has attained substantial student attraction. Kshitij is a realm where the sky meets the sea. ‘Soaring Beyond the Horizon’ is the thought behind the festival.

Mithibai Kshitij in the year 2020 was conducted online with a viewership of 5,00,000+ digital footprints. It was also the only college festival in Mumbai to conduct a hybrid festival in 2021.

=== Themes ===
Mithibai Kshitij every year associates itself with a theme that resembles the ideation and vision of the festival for that particular year.

- 2024 - The Arcade Warehouse
- 2023 - A Euphoric Escapade
- 2022 - An Everlasting Flame
- 2021 - Har Dil Ek Sitara
- 2020 - Sapno Ka Safar
- 2019 - An Eternal Evolution
- 2018 - A Nostalgic Takeover
- 2017 - India; A Divine Abode
- 2016 - Manifestation of a Mirage
- 2015 - Legion of Legends
- 2014 - Esfera de Fiesta; Celebrating Cultures
- 2013 - Spectrum Ablaze
- 2012 - Realm of Raga
- 2011 - Broadway Boulevard
- 2010 - Celebrating 50 years of Mithibai
- 2009 - The Carnival
- 2008 - Superpowers Unleashed
- 2007 - Break Free

== Sponsors ==
Mithibai Kshitij has been sponsored by brands like McDonald's, Book My Show, Godrej Properties, Mobistorm, Airtel, Warner Bros, UniBall, Vero Moda, Skechers, Nokia, HDFC, 9XM, Jack & Jones, Maharashtra Times, Ponds, Celio India, Coca-Cola, Puma, PVR, INOX, Jumbo King, UFO, LUPIN, SUGAR Cosmetics, and Aditya Birla Group over the years.

== Events ==
=== Competitions ===
Mithibai Kshitij conducts events in the fields of Performing Arts, Literary Arts, Creatives and Fine Arts, Business, Gaming, and Sports. It has received innumerable support for conducting Para Events i.e. events for the disabled.

=== Concerts ===
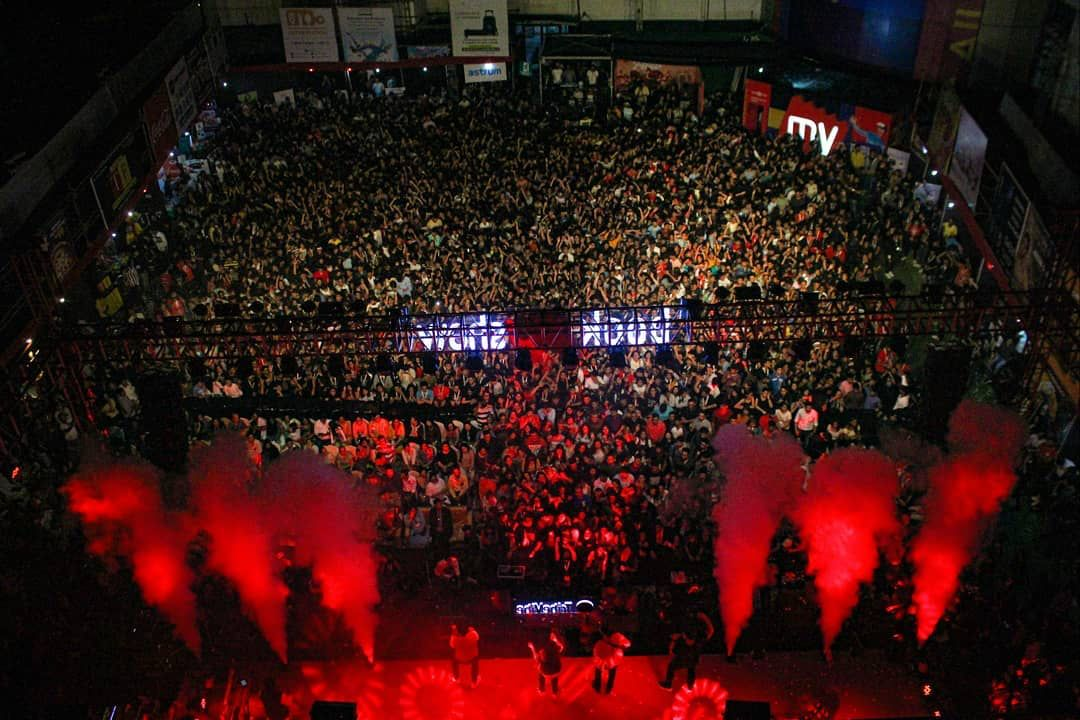
Pronite at Mithibai Kshitij

Mithibai Kshitij's musical concerts also known as Pronites have prominent Indian and International artists perform live. Mithibai Kshitij has hosted Kailash Kher in 2010, Jaz Dhami in 2016, Farhan Akhtar and StadiumX in 2017, Arjun Kanungo and Vishal Shekhar in 2018, Salim Sulaiman, Mohit Chauhan, Himesh Reshammiya, Ankit Tiwari, Amaal Malik, Kanika Kapoor and Meet Bros in 2019, Krishnakumar Kunnath popularly known as KK in 2021, Sunidhi Chauhan, Javed Ali and King (rapper) in 2022, The Yellow Diary (an Indie Alt-Rock Band), Amit Trivedi and Sachin-Jigar in 2023.

=== Marathon ===
Mithibai Kshitij conducts a Green Run which is a 7 km marathon around the locality of Juhu in Mumbai which took place in 2012 for the first time and was again conducted in 2017, 2018, 2019 and 2022. There is no registration fee collected to participate in this run.

=== Celebrity Interaction ===
In 2023, Mithibai Kshitij was pre-launched with Neil Nitin Mukesh and launched with Aditya Roy Kapur.

In the past years, Mithibai Kshitij has been visited by numerous artists from various industries such as actors, singers, dancers, comedians, performers and civil service professionals. Mithibai Kshitij in 2022 was launched by the cast of Goodbye (2022) and Dobaaraa which included Rashmika Mandanna with Pavail Gulati and Taapsee Pannu with Anurag Kashyap respectively.

Mithibai Kshitij has conducted various movie, series and song promotions with artists like Suhana Khan, Khushi Kapoor, Vedang Raina, Agastya Nanda, Mihir Ahuja, Yuvraj Menda and Aditi Dot for The Archies, Rajkumar Rao for Guns and Gulaabs, Dino James, Rashmeet Kaur and Sheezan Khan for Khatron Ke Khiladi, Shantanu Maheshwari and Shruti Sinha for Campus Beats, Bhuvan Bam for Taaza Khabar, Rohit Saraf, Prajakta Koli and Rannvijay Singha for Mismatched, Kartik Aaryan, Kiara Advani and Rajpal Yadav for Bhool Bhulaiyaa 2 in 2022, Sara Ali Khan for her movies Atrangi Re in 2021 and Kedarnath in 2018, Siddharth Malhotra for Shershaah in 2020, Kartik Aaryan, Ananya Panday and Bhumi Pednekar for Pati Patni Aur Woh in 2019, Remo D'souza and the crew of Street Dancer in 2019, Sushant Singh Rajput and Shraddha Kapoor for Chhichhore in 2019, Aishwarya Rai Bachchan for Sarbjit in 2016, Ranbir Kapoor and Anushka Sharma for Ae Dil Hai Mushkil in 2016, Varun Dhawan for Badlapur in 2015, Alia Bhatt and Shahid Kapoor for Shaandaar in 2015, Akshay Kumar, Jacqueline Fernandez and Sidharth Malhotra for Brothers in 2015, Hrithik Roshan and Priyanka Chopra for Krrish 3 in 2013, Sunny Leone and Sachiin Joshi for Jackpot in 2013 and Bappi Lahiri, Vidya Balan, Sunidhi Chauhan, Vishal–Shekhar, Emraan Hashmi, Tusshar Kapoor for Dirty Picture in 2011.

Mithibai Kshitij, for its competitions, has renowned artists who are a part of their judging panel. Artists like Siddhant Chaturvedi, Remo D'souza, Shaan, Armaan Malik, Shreyas Talpade, Dabboo Ratnani, Adah Sharma, Ahsaas Channa, Anu Malik, Sajid Khan, Yashraj Mukhate, Tanishaa Mukerji, Neeraj Gaba, Shruti Sinha, Benafsha Soonawalla, Mohena Singh, Kiku Sharda, Suyyash Rai, Alisha Singh, Prince Narula, Namrata Soni, Prashant Samtani, Siddharth Kannan, Mayur Vaidya and many more.

Mithibai Kshitij launched their talk show i.e. 'The Kshitij Show' which staged artists like Vicky Kaushal, Rakul Preet Singh, Sunny Kaushal, Radhika Apte, Gauahar Khan, Rithvik Dhanjani and many more.

== Social Causes ==
=== 2023 ===
In 2023, Mithibai Kshitij hosted a panel discussion titled, AASTHA- Acid Attack Survivors: Triumph over Heinous Acts, to spread awareness about the rising rate of such crimes and prevention measures for the same.

In collaboration with the Rotary Club of Mumbai City, Mithibai Kshitij organised a beach cleanup at the Juhu Beach. They also organised a live screening of the India-Pakistan World Cup match for the underprivileged children from Being Child Care.

On 26/11, Mithibai Kshitij in collaboration with the Rotary Club of Mumbai City, NSG Blackcat Commandos and Mumbai Police, organised a candle march at the Gateway of India, paying their tributes to the martyrs of 26/11.

=== 2022 ===
In 2022, Mithibai Kshitij collaborated with the Planet for Plants and Animals India organisation to spread awareness regarding stray accidents at night via the use of reflective collars. A drive for the same was conducted in localities around Mumbai like Carter Road, Marine Drive and Juhu Beach. 1000 stray dogs were provided with these collars while an awareness campaign was carried out at Sunday Streets at Marine Drive.

=== 2021 ===
In 2021, Mithibai Kshitij helped raise a voice for delivery personnel via a short film on the daily problems faced by them.

=== 2019 ===
In the year 2019 Team Kshitij and JOSH Foundation organized an awareness program for the hearing impaired for the World Deaf Day.

=== 2017 ===
1. Mithibai College students in 2017 collaborated with the Brihanmumbai Municipal Corporation (BMC) to conduct a cleanup drive at Juhu beach .
2. Team Kshitij also conducted an activity for the Cancer patients at Tata Memorial Hospital as they engaged in fun game sessions, dance and a magic show.
