= Engifest =

- Genre: Cultural
- Begins: 17 February 2023
- Ends: 19 February 2023
- Frequency: Annual
- Venue: Delhi Technological University
- Location: Delhi
- Country: India
- Inaugurated: 1974; 48 years ago
- Attendance: 1,50,000+ (2020)
- Organiser: DTU Cultural Council
- Website: www.engifest.dtu.ac.in

Engifest is the annual cultural festival of Delhi Technological University (formerly Delhi College of Engineering). Usually held in the month of February, it is a three-day-long event. It was started in 1974 by students of DTU.

== Introduction ==
Engifest is one of the largest college cultural festivals of the country. It is a student-run non-profit organization which caters primarily to youth. Engifest includes a variety of events such as car and bike show, drag racing, cultural performances, live wire-star night, rock shows, plays on social problems, dances, and others. Engifest has been studded by artists like Shreya Goshal, Sonu Nigam, Sunidhi Chauhan, Vishal–Shekhar, Mohit Chauhan, Amit Trivedi, Papon (singer), Raftaar, Talwiinder, Jasmine Sandlas , Nucleya, Bassjackers, Quintino (DJ), DJ NYK, Boogie Frantick, Bhuvan Bam, VJ Bani, Aditi Arya, Salman Yusuff Khan, Kumar Vishwas, Piyush Mishra, Karan Kundra, Hard Kaur, Sidhu Moose Wala.

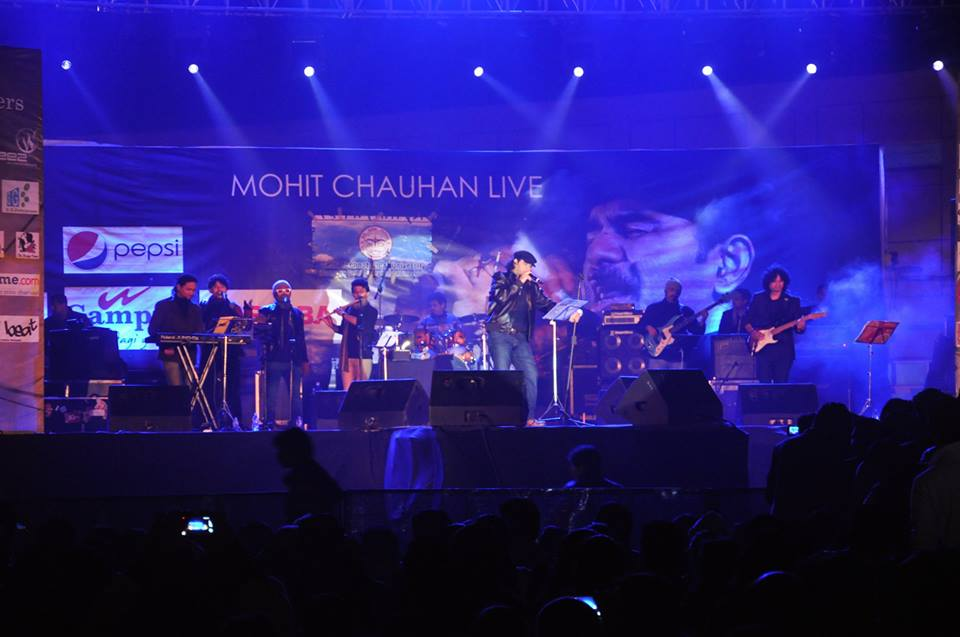
Mohit Chauhan Live at Engifest 2014

== History ==
Engifest was first started by students of the Delhi Technological University (DTU), formerly known as Delhi College of Engineering, in 1974.

By 2014, the fest had a diverse range of events and performances artists and celebrities such as Mohit Chauhan and Hard Kaur. In 2015, the festival improved upon its range with performances from Raftaar, Manj Musik, and more.

Engifest 2016 saw Piyush Mishra.

Engifest 2018 saw Stand-up comedian Abijit Ganguly, musician Amit Trivedi, Punjabi singer Guri, and DJ MAG #35 Bassjackers on the EDM night performed live.

Engifest 2019 saw DJ MAG #25, Quintino performing live.

Engifest 2020 saw 1.5 lakh+ students with Sidhu Moosewala (who performed for the first time in any college festival), Papon, and Divine.

== Festival Sponsors and Past Affiliates ==
The print media partner of Engifest is Hindustan Times whereas its digital media partners include All India Radio, 9x Jalwa including others.
