= Eutopian Euphorians =

Eutopian Euphorians is the annual Cultural fest organised by Meghnad Saha Institute of Technology, held during March–April every year. The fest typically goes for 2–3 days and is held at different venues in Kolkata.

== Performers ==
Apart from numerous college performers and dramatists, the fest witnesses the performances by some legendary guest singers and bands every year. Some of guest performers are listed below:

- Fossils
- Abhijeet
- Shreya Ghoshal
- Javed Ali
- Abhijeet Sawant
- Myrath
- Cactus
- Amit Sana
- Chandrabindu
