= Spandan (JIPMER) =

Spandan is the annual intercollegiate cultural, literary and sports festival of the Jawaharlal Institute of Postgraduate Medical Education & Research, Pondicherry, India.

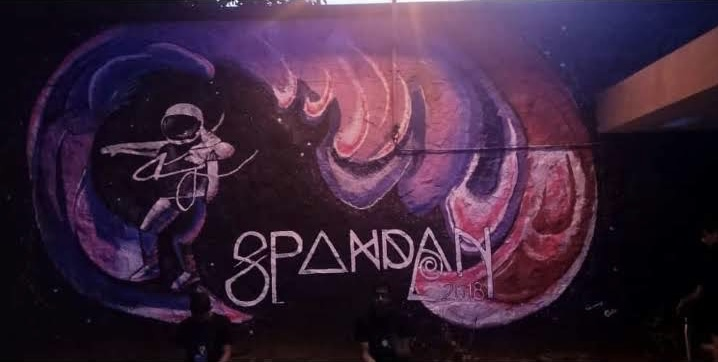
A wall painting at Spandan 2019

It is held in late August and early September, and spans 7 days. Spandan is the largest medical inter-college festival in southern India, in terms of sheer attendance. Spandan has participants from medical colleges all over India as well as from regional engineering colleges. The number of registered participants is around 5000 every year from over 70 colleges.

== History ==
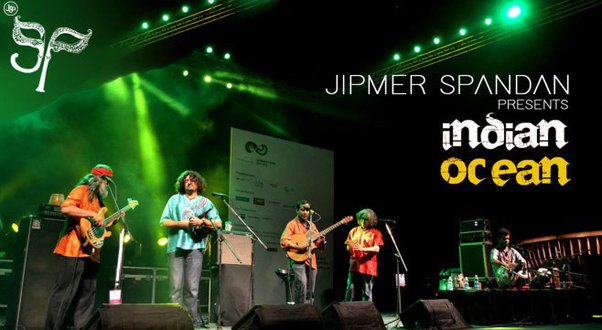
The Indian rock band Indian Ocean at Spandan 2019

In the 1960s and 1970s the JIPMER Students Association conducted an inter-collegiate sporting festival that included the Dr.S.S.Chaddha Memorial Hockey tournament and the Dr.S.L.Basu Memorial Football tournament. In 1978, the inter-collegiate sporting festival became Les Jeux and included basketball and badminton in addition to hockey and football. In 1980, cultural and literary events were added to the sporting events and were named Les Beaux Arts. In 1982, Les Jeux and Les Beaux Arts were folded into the overarching Spandan festival.

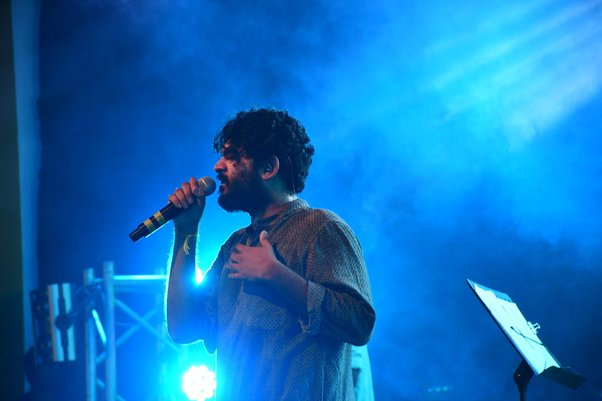
Sid Sriram at Spandan

== See also ==
- Jawaharlal Institute of Postgraduate Medical Education & Research
- Cultural Festivals in Indian Colleges
