= Pradharshini =

- Genre: Cultural festival
- Locations: Chennai, India
- Major events: Light Music, Variety Variety, Fashion Nite, Choreo Nite, Gaming
- Filing status: Non Profit Organization, Student Run
- Sponsor: Kilpauk Medical College
- Website: Pradharshini

Pradharshini is the annual intercollege Cultural festival held at Kilpauk Medical College, one of the premier medical colleges in Tamil Nadu, India. It has been held every year since 1978. It is usually held in the last week of September for 3 days and 4 nights. Pradharshini is considered as one of the biggest cultural festivals of South-India and the biggest conducted by any medical college.

== Origin ==
Pradharshini means "An Exhibition of Art" roughly translated into Tamil as "Kalaimagalin Dharisanam"

== Organization ==
Pradharshini is conducted by the students of Kilpauk Medical College

== History ==
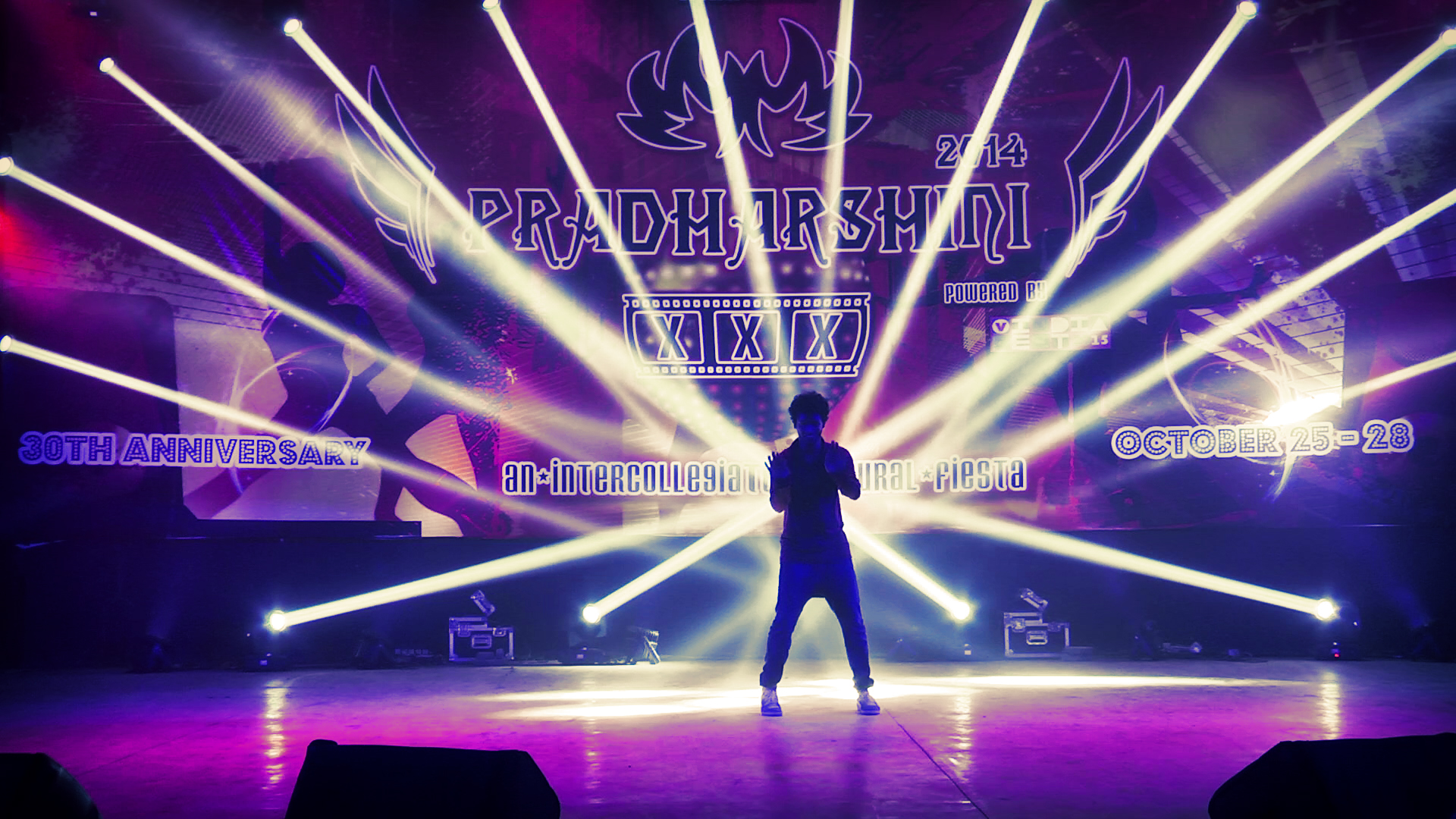
The Stage of Pradharshini 2014

Pradharshini was started in 1986 as a small event with participation from only a handful of colleges. It has continued to grow and now every year it witnesses a participation from over 100 colleges

== Events ==
The most popular of the events at Pradharshini are

=== Western Music ===
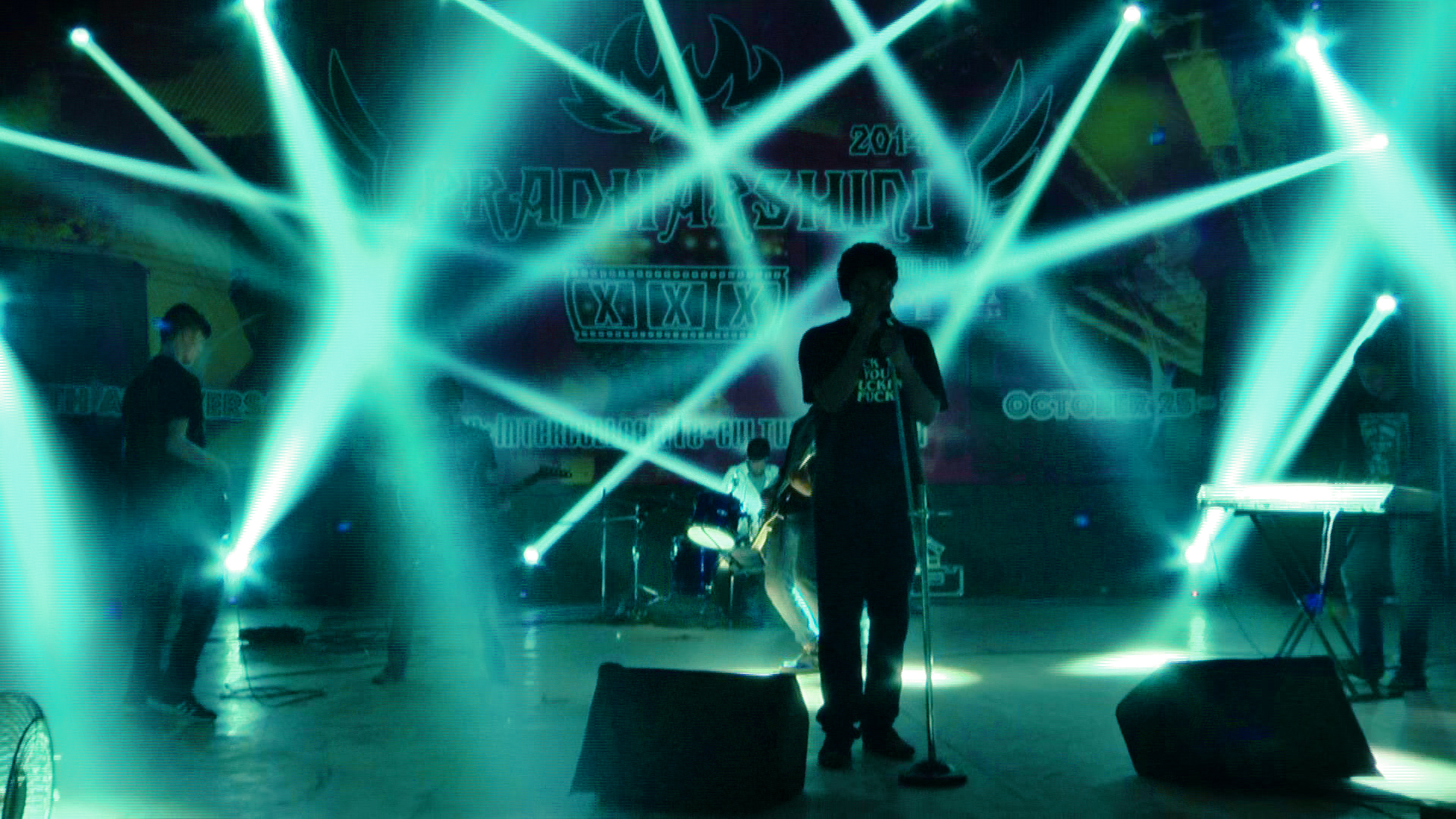
Western Music at Pradharshini 2014

=== Light Music ===
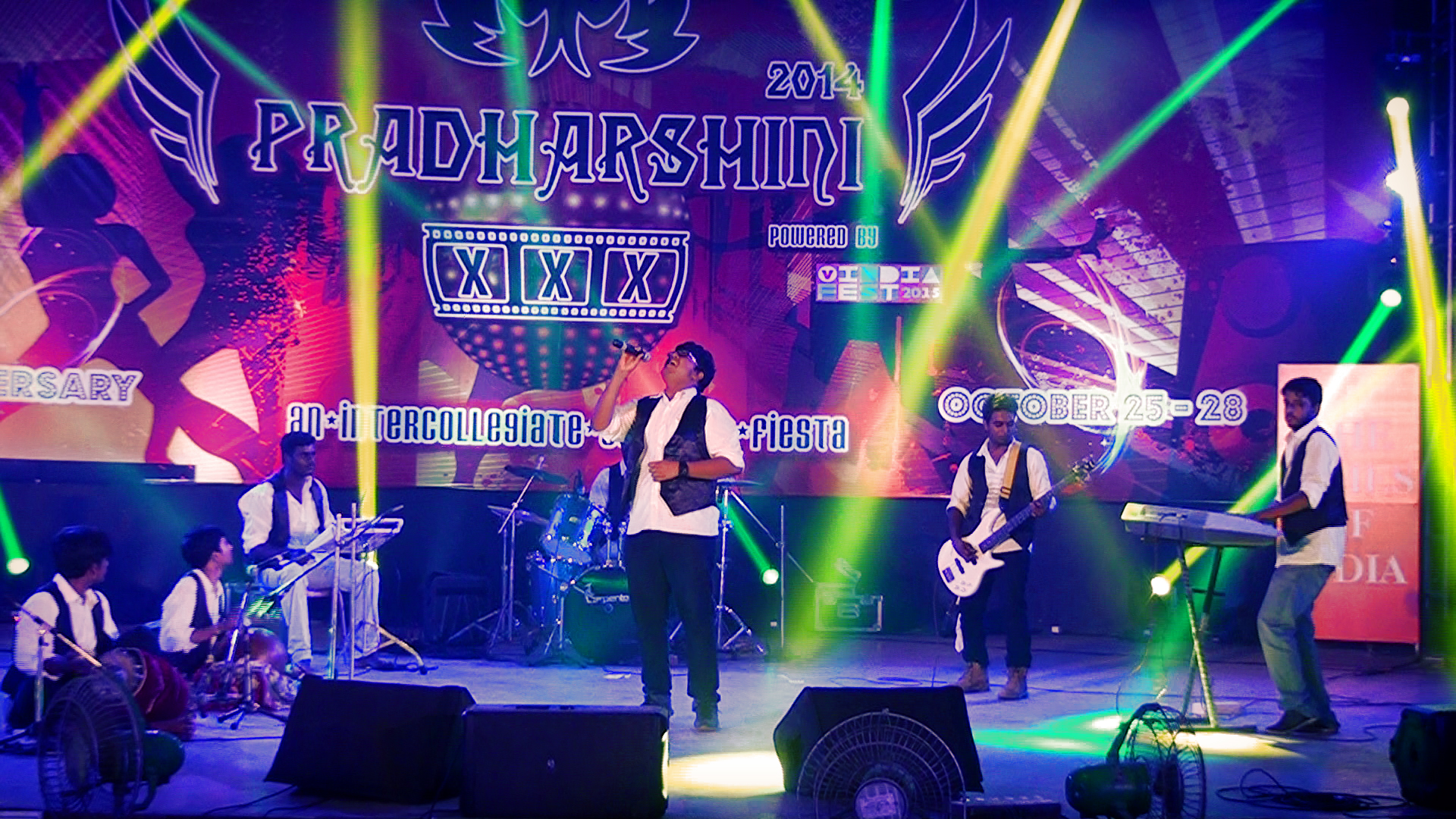
Light Music at Pradharshini 2014

=== Variety Variety ===
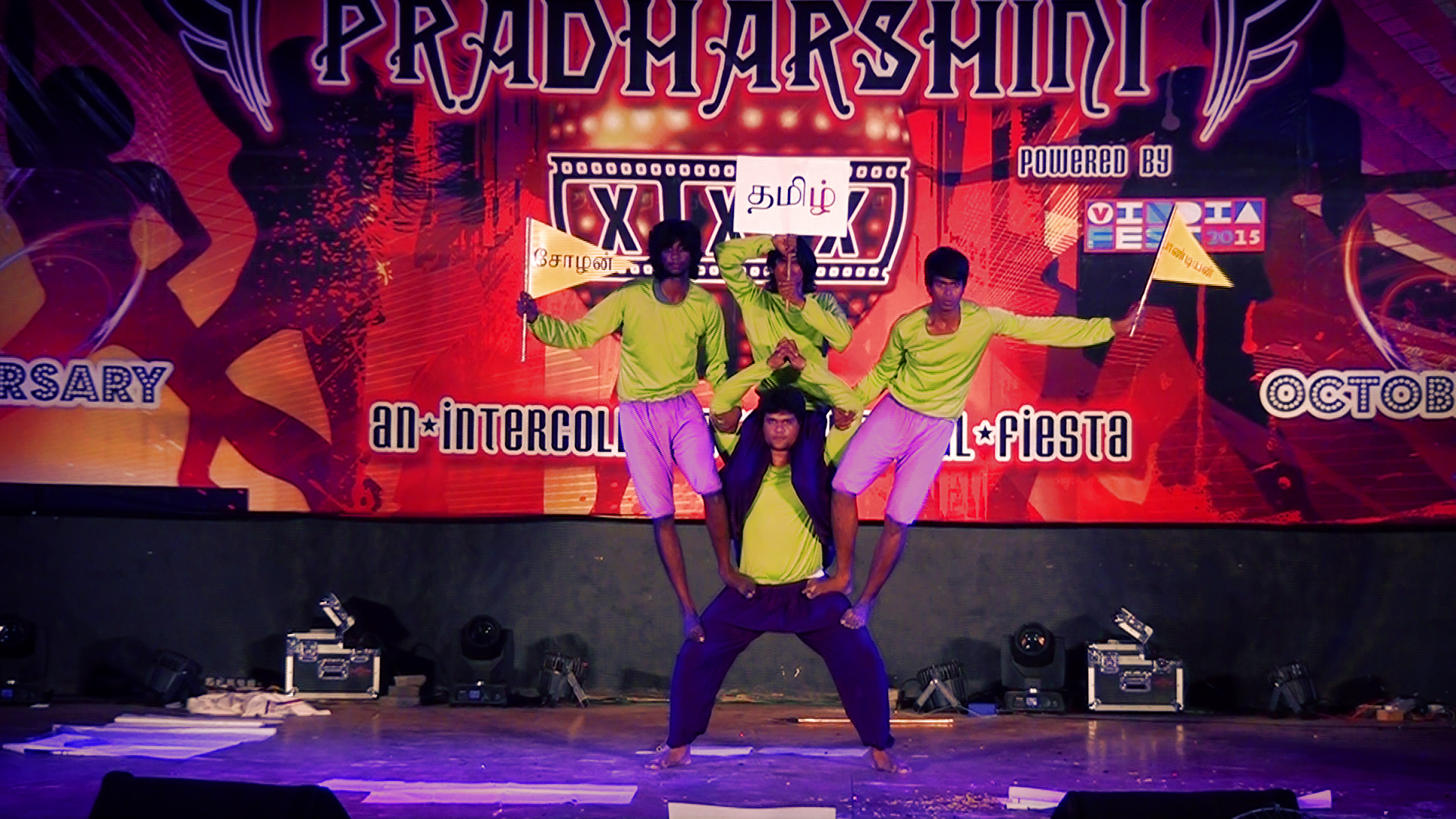
Variety Variety at Pradharshini 2014

=== Fashion ===
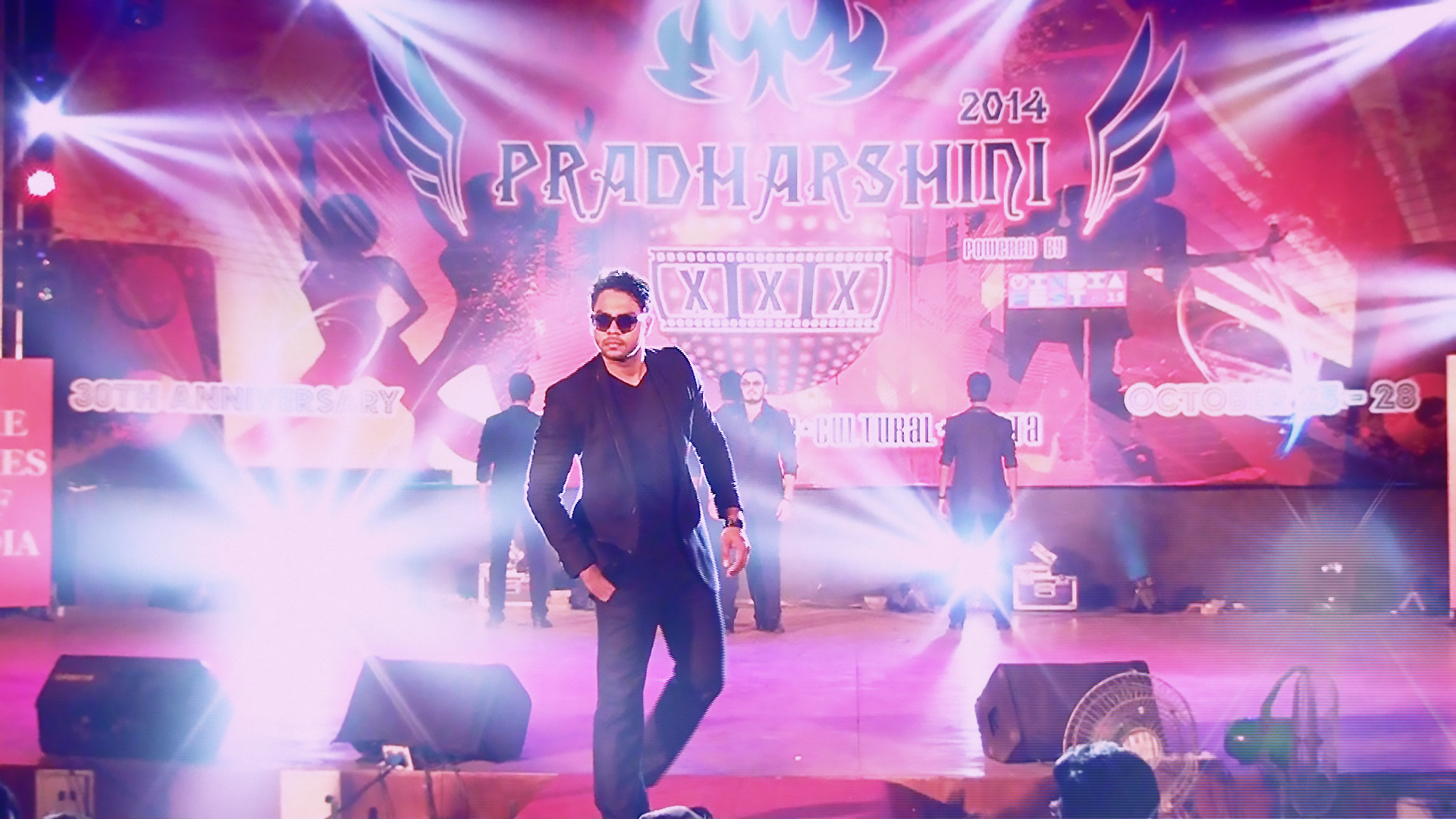
Fashion Nite at Pradharshini 2014

=== Choreo Night ===
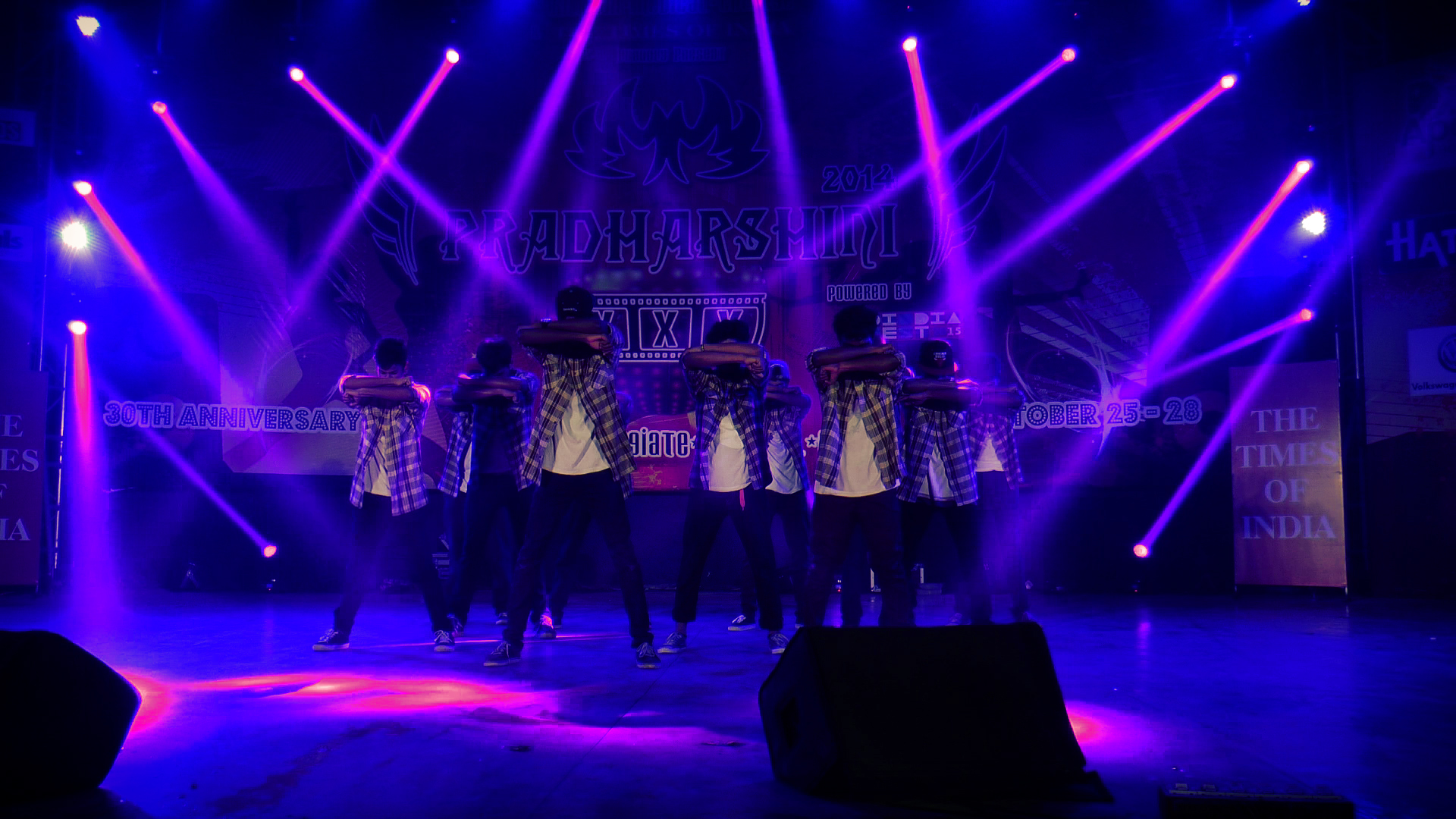
Choreo at Pradharshini 2014

== Minor events ==
Some of the other events that are conducted at Pradharshini include,

- Channel Surfing
- Kaviarangam
- Rangoli
- Pattimandram
- Painting
- Face Painting
- Solo Singing
- Duet Singing
- Instrumentals
- Gaming
- Photography
- Short Film Making
- Shipwreck
- Antyakshari
- Creative Writing
- Cine Quiz
- Hair Styling
- Adzap
- Jam
- General Quiz
- Body Building
- Mono Acting
- Solo Dancing
- Duet Dancing
