= Avalanche UCMS =

Avalanche UCMS is the annual autumn cultural, literary and sports festival of University College of Medical Sciences (Delhi). It is organised in the last week of September each year for two days. Avalanche attracts huge crowd and participation from student community of Delhi which mainly consists of MAMC, LHMC, VMMC, other Delhi University colleges, IIT and Indraprastha University colleges. It has been nurturing and uniting the students as well as the staff in a common bond of celebrations lasting two days. During this time new spirits rise up, responsibilities increase and what comes out of the hard work is a lifetime of memories.

== Activities ==
Avalanche consists of mainly three domains:

=== 1.Cultural events ===
It consists of various activities like western dance(Wave), choreography (Celeste), stage play (Manchayan), street play, Fashion show (Larzish) etc. Huge sum of prize is awarded to winning teams.

=== 2.Literary Events (LITCAFE') ===
Literary society of UCMS "Apokalypto" organises various literary events like Hindi & English debate, GK quiz, Cricket quiz, Just one minute, Poster presentation, Faculty Antakshari etc.

=== 3.Sports events (ARENA) ===
Under the banner of ARENA various sports events like Basketball, cricket, football, table tennis, Chess, carrom, Volleyball are organised. Besides these, other informal events are organised for students of UCMS only.

== Rules for entry ==
Entry to Avalanche is limited to students community on production of i-card of their respective colleges. Alumni of UCMS are also invited in Avalanche who attend it in large numbers and with full enthusiasm. Budget of Avalanche is quite moderate 2–300,000 compared to its spring counterpart Ripple. This amount of money is raised from College Cultural Fund and various sponsors.

== Organisers ==
Organising team of Avalanche consists of 3rd semester students of UCMS under the banner of student union which has president, vice president, cultural secretary, general sec., sports sec., treasurer, literary sec., joint sec. etc.
