= Aarohi =

Aarohi is a Hindi female name. It may refer to:

- Aarohi Patel, Indian actress
- Aarohi Narayan, Indian actress
- Aarohi Pandit, Indian pilot
- Aarohi (film), Bengali film
- Aarohi (cultural festival), held at the Visvesvaraya National Institute of Technology, Nagpur, India

== See also ==
- Arohana
