= Manfest-Varchasva =

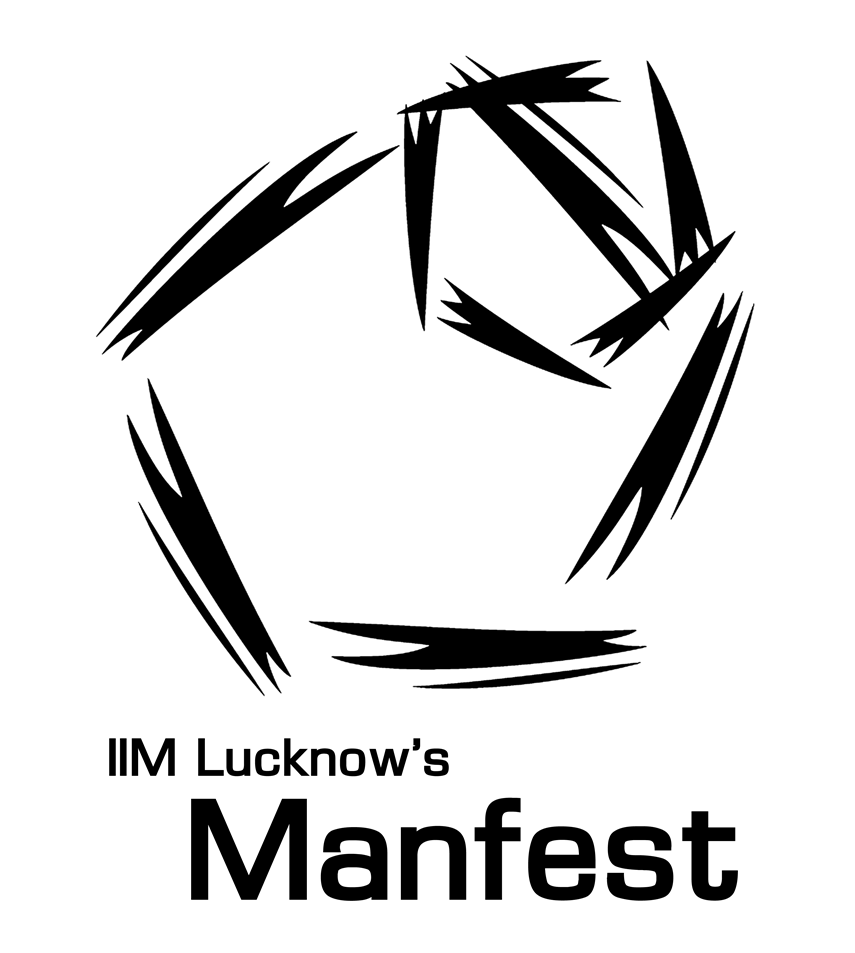
IIM Lucknow's Manfest-Varchasva: The Annual Management and Cultural Festival

Manfest-Varchasva is the annual management and cultural festival organized by Indian Institute of Management Lucknow in the third week of January every year. The three-day festival is the biggest B-school festival in Asia, facilitating interaction among B-school students, faculty and corporates. The festival hosts various management competitions, paper presentations, quizzes, debates, case study analysis and interactive industry-student sessions.

== History ==
Started in the year 1988 as an inter-IIM debate and quiz competition, Manfest has grown into a major business festival attracting international participants. In 2007, Manfest obtained ISO 9001:2000 certification in event management. Every year, the festival is associated with a theme with the competitions and activities in Manfest designed according to the theme. Some of the themes were 'Corporate Social Responsibility'(2005), 'Sustainable Development: Fuelling the Future'(2009). The 25th edition of Manfest was organized in 2012 with the theme 'Innovate, Implement and Inspire: Build a Legacy'.

== Events ==
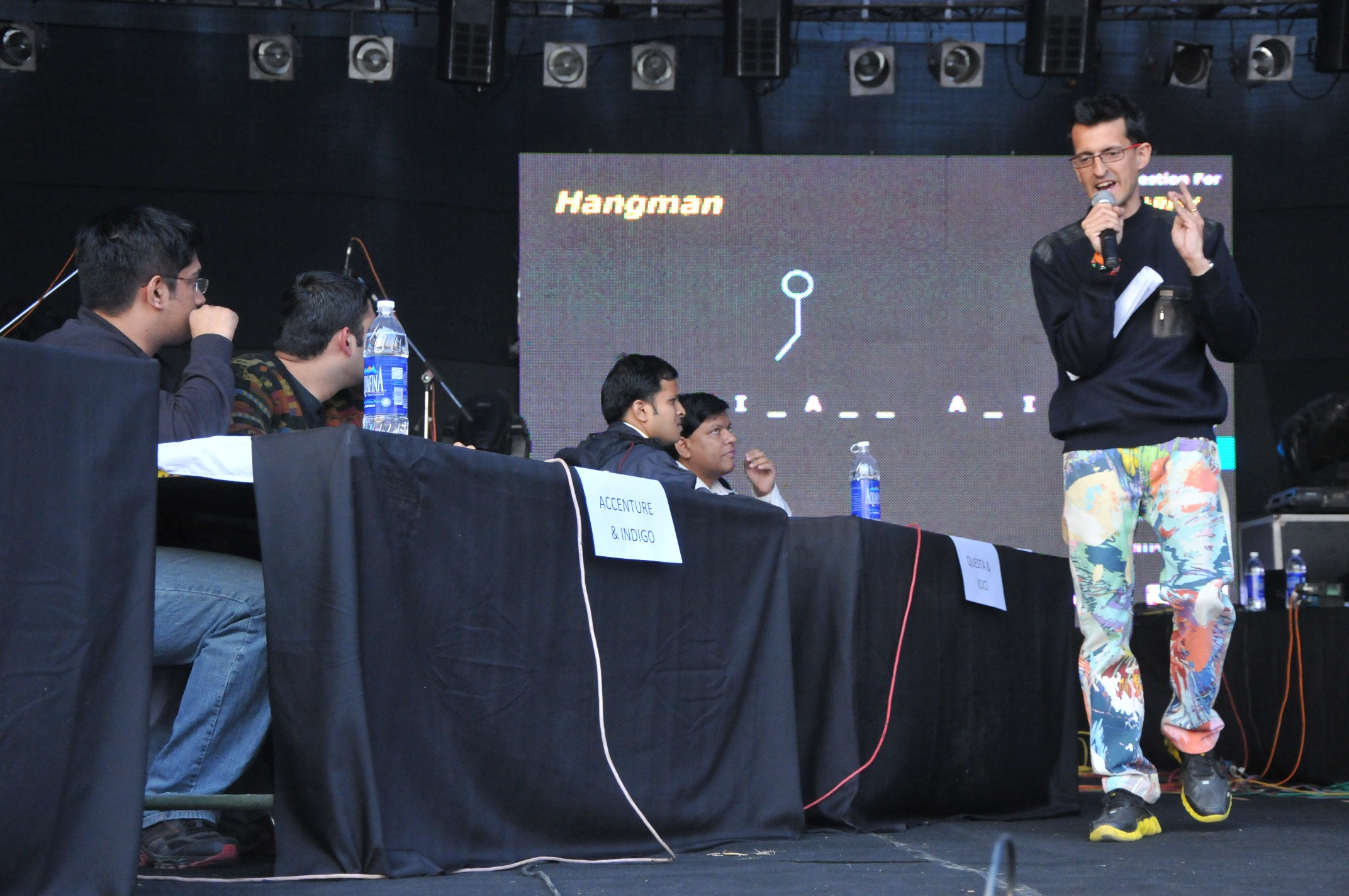
Bizquiz: Manfest 2011

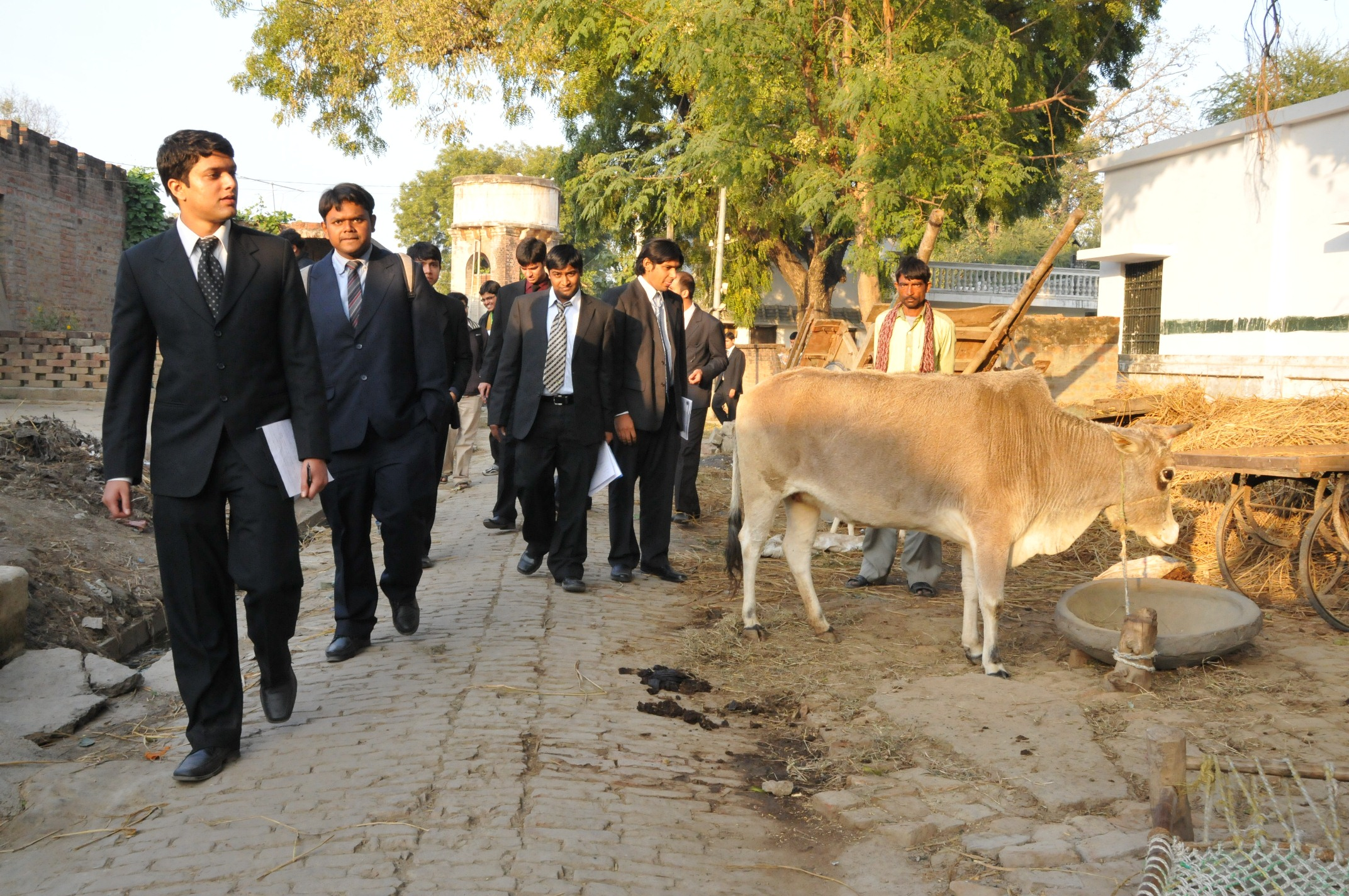
The NextCEO: Manfest 2011

The Flagship events of the festival include 'The Next CEO', 'Call for Arms', 'Biz Quiz' and 'Zeus'. The Winners of the competitions were rewarded with placement offers from Tata Administrative Services, Mahindra and Mahindra, Colgate-Palmolive, Accenture, L&T among others. The Biz Quiz (Business Quiz) is conducted professionally by renowned quiz masters. The quizzing event is conducted for B-school students as well as corporate participants. The festival also organizes different management workshops by leading industry professionals in the fields like finance, communications, etc. Many business oriented simulation games are conducted including 'C-Trader', the carbon credit trading competition. The 'Biz-Theatre' is a case competition where different companies present cases based on real facts and participants provide solutions to the companies. 'Treatise', started in 2007, is an online debate competition open for undergraduates, post graduates as well as corporates.

=== CSR based events ===
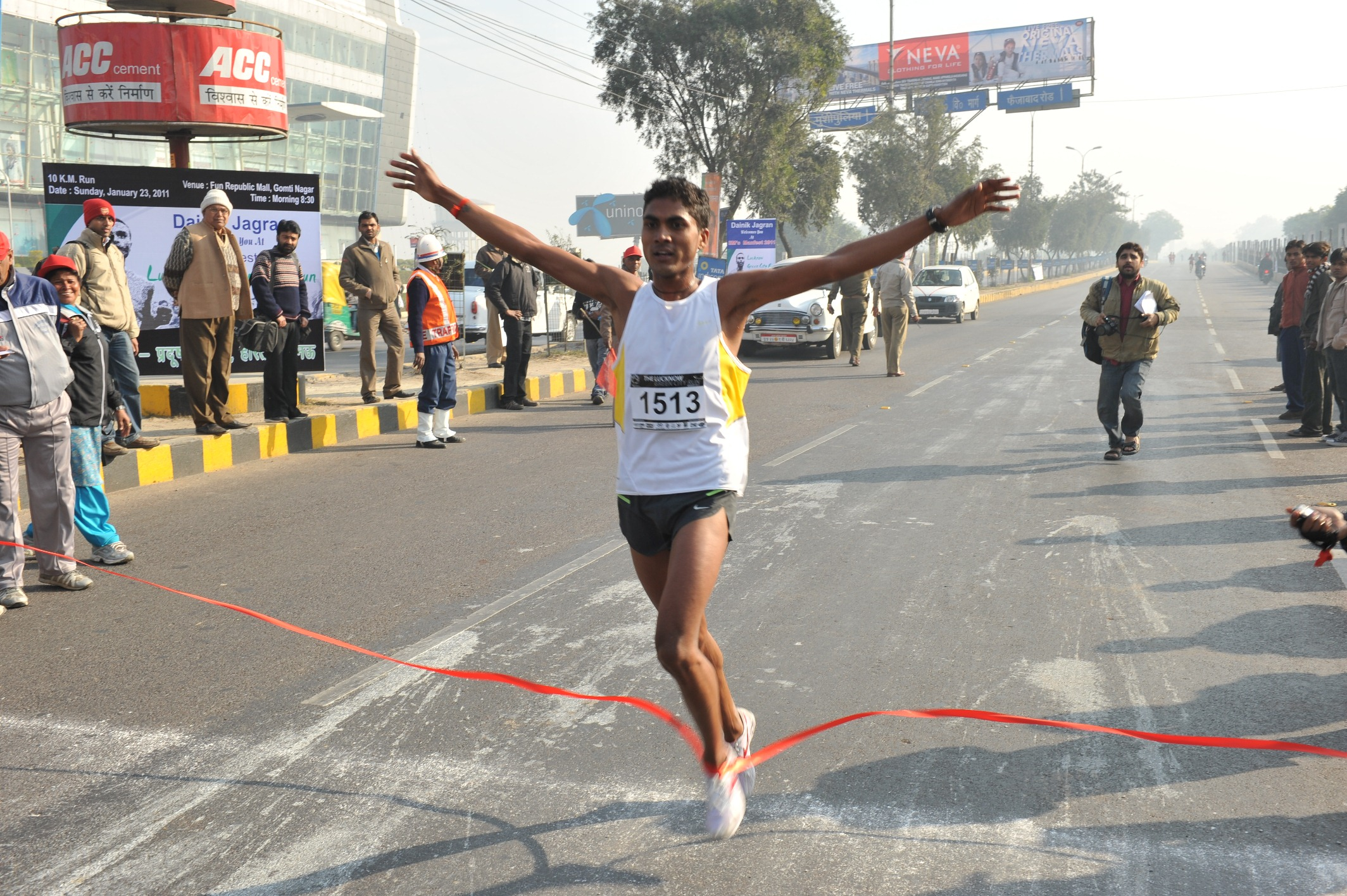
The Lucknow City Run: Manfest 2011

Many Corporate Social Responsibility (CSR) events are organized in collaboration with various NGOs and companies. 'Dayita', an online simulation game where participants adopt a village and identify the problems in it. Prerna Social Entrepreneurship Awards are given to entrepreneurs working on socially relevant issues. These awards are initiated in 2009. The Lucknow City Run was started in 2009 to raise awareness for a certain social issue each year. Each year, Lucknow City Run sees thousands of Lucknow residents run for causes such as AIDS Awareness (2010) and Sustainable Living (2011). The event Yajna, started in 2011, is conducted in association with NGOs and corporates. It provides B-school students social entrepreneurship projects to solve. The projects are based in many cities of India.

== Leadership summit ==
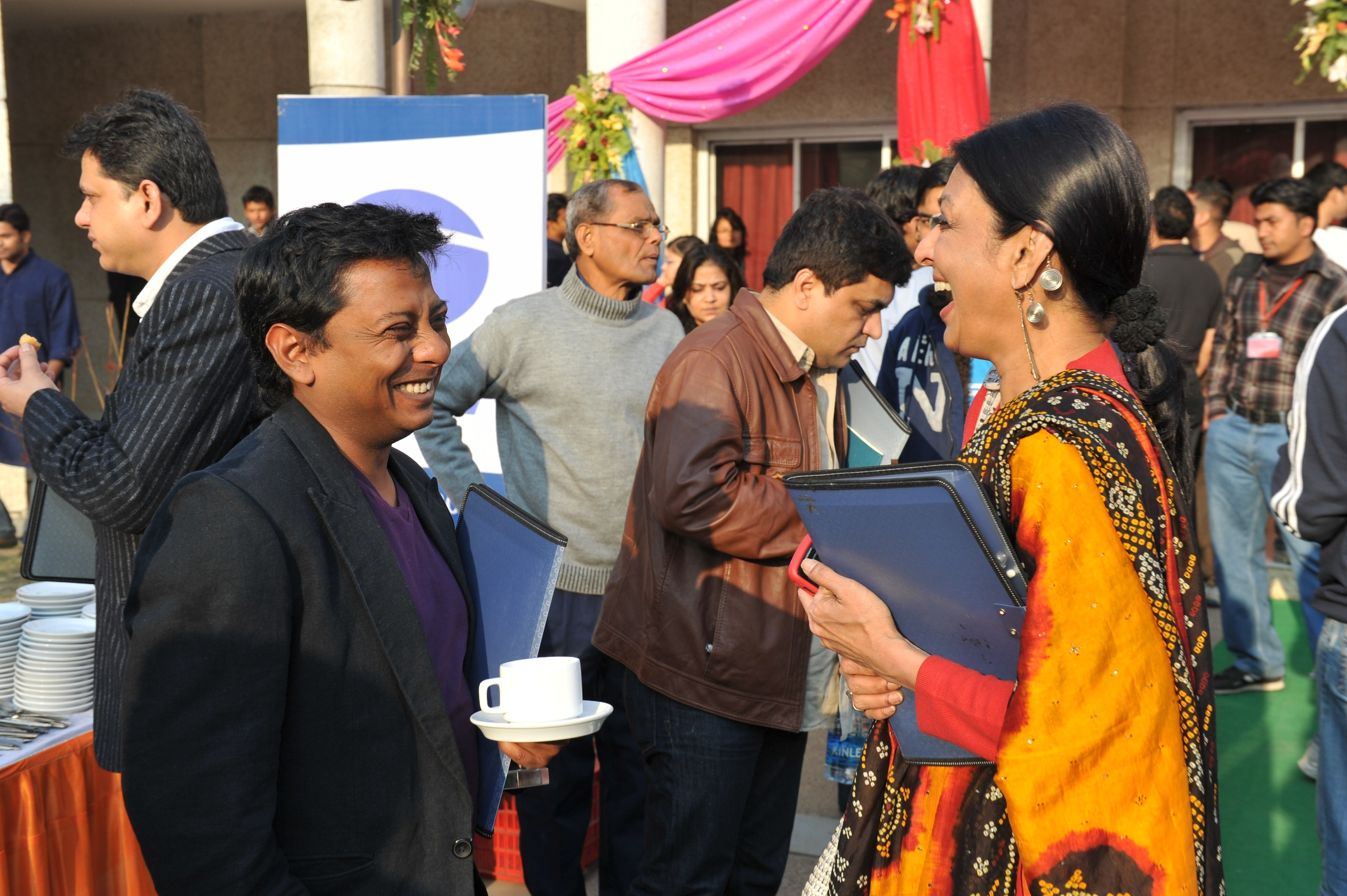
Mallika Sarabhai: Srujan, Manfest 2011

Leaders Express includes various talks, conclaves, luncheons, webinars, seminars and panel discussions. In the past, these events have been visited by Jajaira, Dilip Chhabria, Rahul Bose, Mallika Sarabhai, Mahesh Bhatt and S.Ramadorai.

Business Conclaves

There are 2 business conclaves held during Manfest. Business leaders from a specific field discuss sector-specific issues. The conclaves at Manfest 2011 were Srujan - The Creative Arts & Media Conclave, and Arthashaastra - The Finance Leadership Summit.

Anjuman

This is a corporate luncheon, held in partnership with the Industry Interaction Cell of IIM Lucknow, for faculty, business heads, young corporates and students. Key-note speakers present particular topics after which the audience interact with the leaders.

An annual business publication named 'Gravitas' is released during Manfest. It is a collection of essays by leaders, industrialists, economists and policy makers with leaders like Kiran Mazumdar Shaw, Vikram Pandit, R K Pachauri having written exclusively for Gravitas.

== Entertainment ==
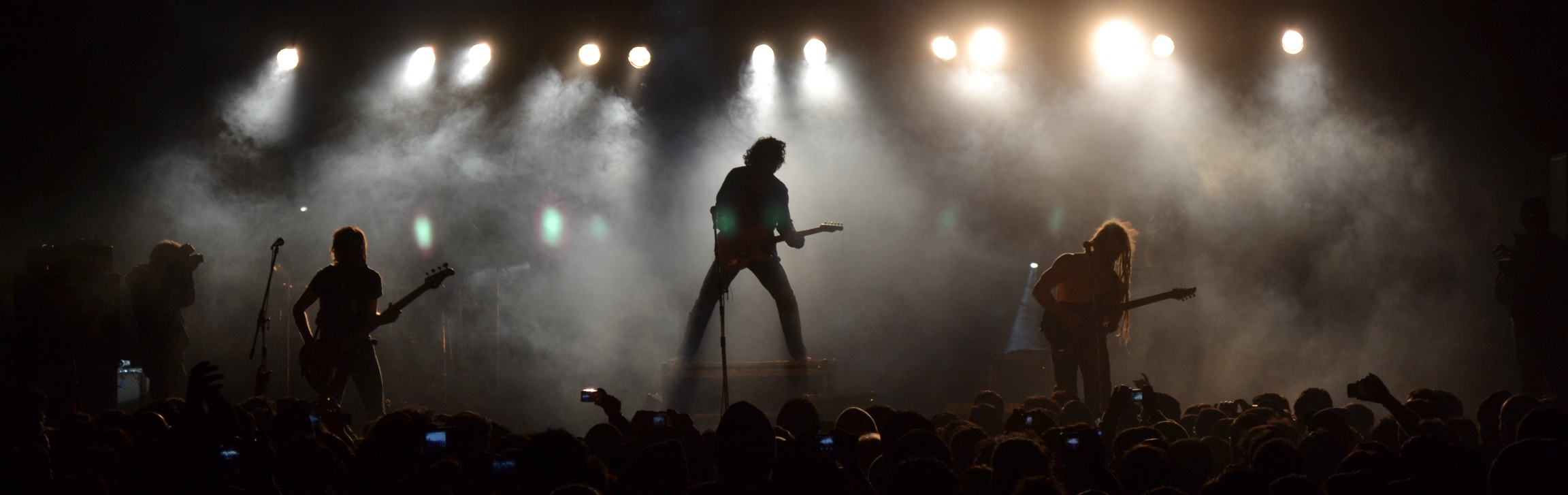
Pain of Salvation: First International Rock Performance at an IIM

There are three cultural events spread across the three days of Manfest.

=== Cultural Nite ===
An evening dedicated to the exponents of Indian Classical music, conducted in association with SPIC-MACAY, the IIM Lucknow Chapter, it brings with itself every possible flavor of vocal and instrumental Indian Classical Music.

=== Bollywood Nite ===
This is a cultural program by Bollywood musicians. Manfest’s Bollywood Nites have been graced by Salim-Sulaiman (2011), Kailash Kher (2010), Kay Kay (2009), Euphoria and Mohit Chauhan (2008)

=== International Rock Nite ===
The Rock band ‘Pain of Salvation’ performed in Manfest 2011. A semi-professional rock band competition is also conducted for both originals and cover versions. In Manfest 2011, the winning band opened for Pain of Salvation. There are also a number of non-business informal events organized at Manfest.

== Organization ==
Manfest-Varchasva is organized by the Manfest-Varchasva Core Committee that is selected from within the student body of IIM Lucknow.
