= Riviera (festival) =

Annual sports and cultural festival

Riviera - VIT-Vellore
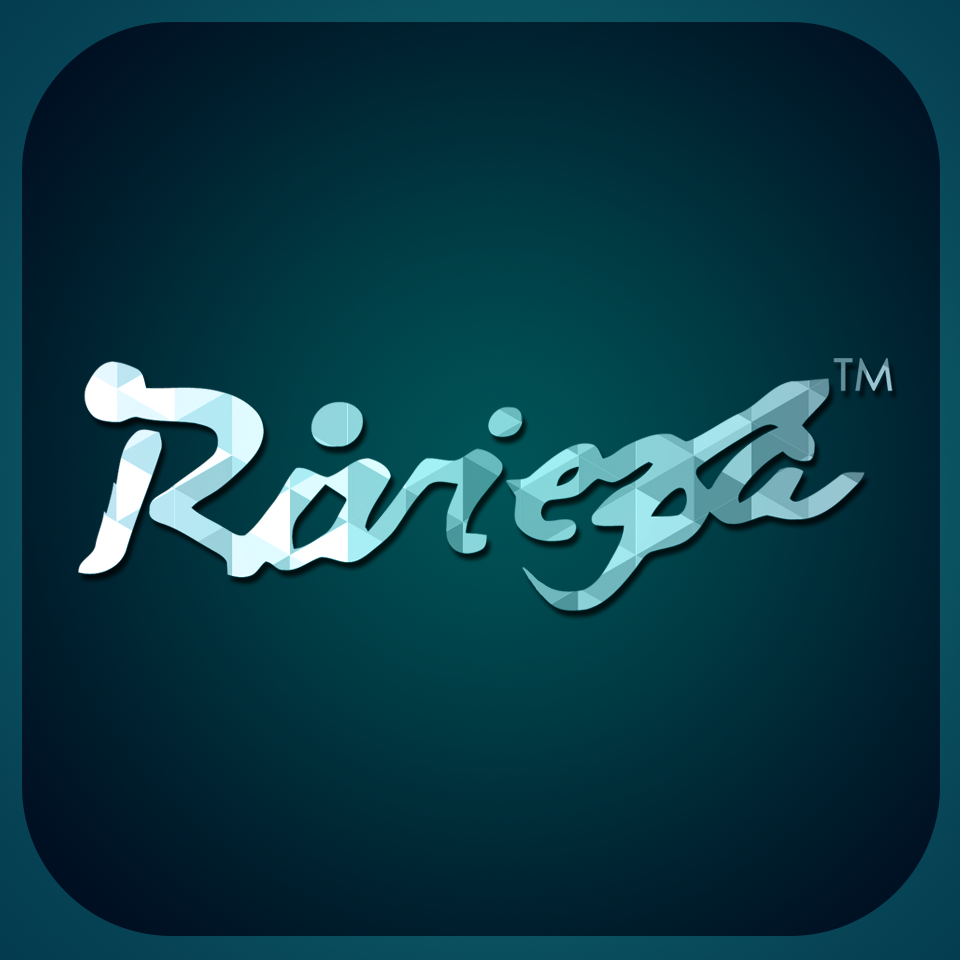
- #RaiseTheCraze
- Genre: Sports and Cultural Carnival
- Date: 29 February 2024 to 3 March 2024
- Locations: Vellore, India
- Country: India
- Years active: 22
- Founded: 2002
- Attendance: 40,000+ Footfall, 150+ Institutes, 30+ Countries
- Major events: Pro-Shows. Drama. Fine Arts. Dance. Music. Games
- Filing status: Student Run, non-Profit Organization
- Prize money: 10 Lakhs
- Website: https://riviera.vit.ac.in/
- Riviera'24

Riviera is the Annual International Sports and Cultural Carnival of the Vellore Institute of Technology. It is an International 4-day event that consists of sports competitions, social and cultural events along with concerts. The 2016 edition of Riviera witnessed a footfall of more than 30,000 students from over 650 colleges from across the country. It is organised primarily by the students of the college. It has a wide variety of competitions and events, which range from dramatic, literary, musical, dance, debate events all the way to informal events. It is usually held in the month of February every year.

== History ==
The festival was introduced by VIT's Chancellor, Dr. G. Viswanathan. The first Riviera was in 2002 and was a success with a wide range of events in all cultural spheres including music, dance, drama, literary events and more. Sports competitions were also part of this first festival. It saw a fair amount of external participants which would grow in the years to come. It would also be included on the list of the Top 10 Cultural Festivals in India.

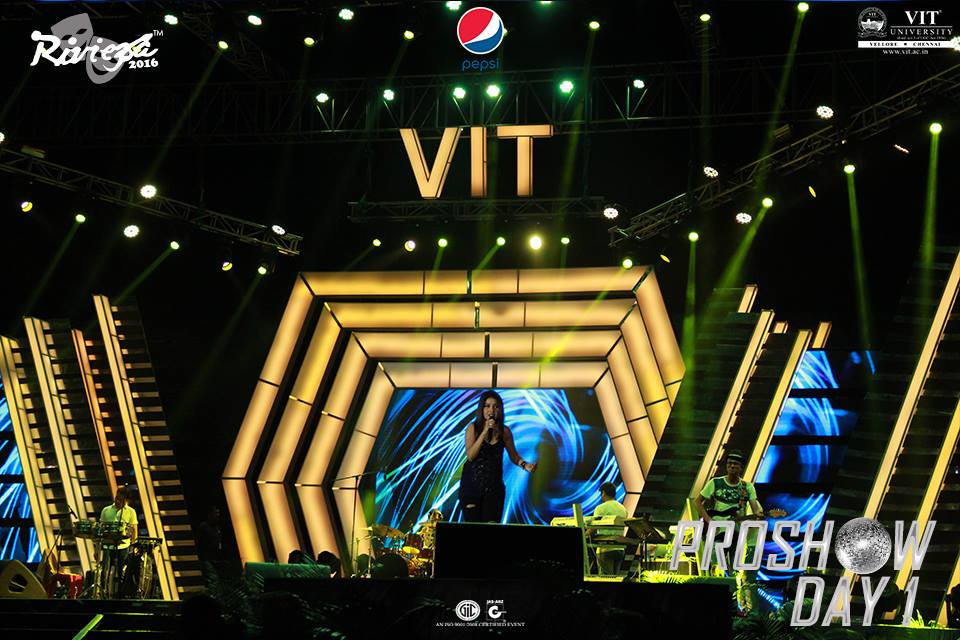
Sunidhi Chauhan during proshows

== Pro-shows ==
Riviera has hosted several 'Pro-shows', concerts where well known singers, DJs and dance groups perform. These pro-show nights are highly anticipated by both internal and external participants and as such feature upcoming or established performers. The acts are most often Indian performers, though international acts have made appearances as well. From the humble beginnings of upcoming bands such as Effekt Krew, an acrobatics group from Romania (2002), Moksh, a Thane based Marathi rock band(2004) Riviera has gone on to attract the likes of music directing duo Vishal-Shekhar, Saleem, and Shankar Mahadevan(2009), with most recently Benny Dayal(2015), Vasundhara Das(2015), Sunidhi Chauhan(2016), Parikrama and DJ Lloyd all making appearances at the 2016 iteration of Riviera.

== Events ==
=== Cultural events ===
Cultural events are hosted by the various clubs on campus and pertain to their club mandates. These events majorly fall into the category of literary and quiz, fine arts, music and performing arts.

==== Literary and Quiz Events ====
The English, Kannada, Hindi and Tamil Literary Associations and the Quiz Club host the following events. The literary events are in the aforementioned languages whereas the quiz is common for all. These are events like What's The Good Word, Creative Writing, Crossword, Ad-Zap, JAM, Dumb Charades, Block And Tackle, Shipwreck, The Sound Of Silence, Spin-A-Yarn, Yes-No-Maybe, Potpourri, Poetry and Debates. The quizzes held can be General quiz, Sports and Entertainment (Spent) quiz.

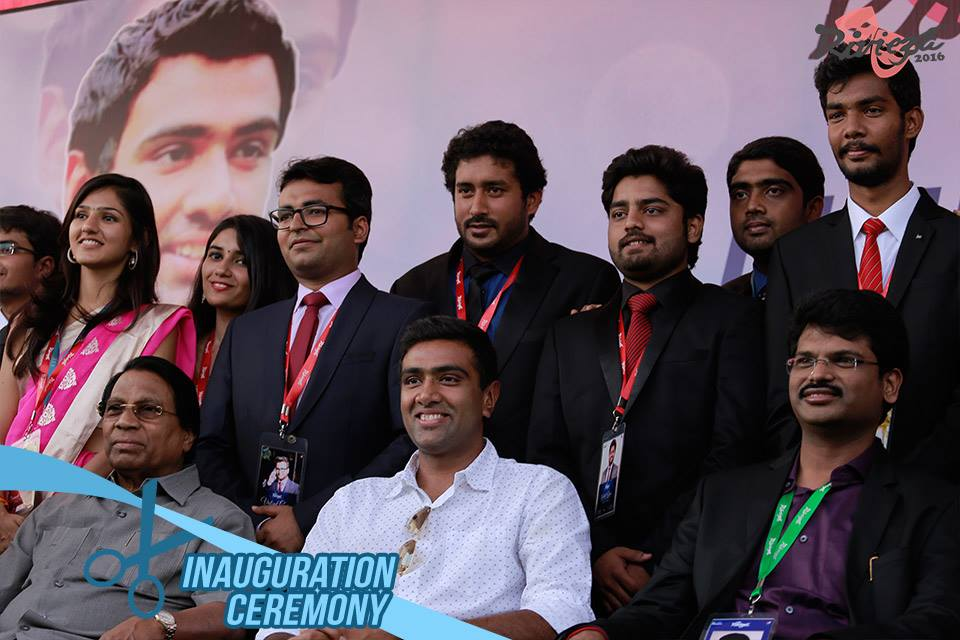
Inauguration Ceremony

==== Fine arts ====
The Fine Arts Club (TFAC) of VIT University hosts Sketching and Painting. Events face painting and tattoo making contests also take place during the festival. TFAC is also responsible for the decoration and artworks displayed around the campus during the fest.

==== Music ====
The Music Club has been known to organize Western acoustic, Headbangers Kall, Indian music, Raaga and Reggae, Antakshari, Sketching, collage making and Eastern Electric in the past however they have made Solo one of their mandate events recently.

==== Performing arts ====
The Dramatics Club, Dance Club and Fashion club organize various stage events according to their mandate, like The Fashion Show, Dramatics, Dance Competitions and Adaptune.

=== Informal ===
These are events that are not organized by a particular club as a mandate or premium event. These are fun events purely designed for entertainment. The informal events VIT University has seen in the past are Student of the Year,Request Stalls, Arm Wrestling, Mister And Miss Riviera, Cluedo, Silichrome, Junkyard Genius, Soap Up, Libaas, Face Painting, Salad Dressing, Lakshya, Urban Warfare, Monarchy Salsa, Street Photography, Tattoo Making, Puppetry And Ventriloquism, Sand Sculptures, Thumb Graffiti, Frisk Factor And Human Foosball. Riviera also hosts various games organized by students Like Darts, 9 Pins, Test Your Strength, Shaving The Balloon, Smashing TT Ball, Hoopla and Balancing Rod.

=== Sports ===
Riviera lays emphasis on sports as it is one of the objectives of the festival. Sports like Basketball, Soccer, Volleyball, Clay Court Tennis, Table Tennis, Throw ball, Chess, Swimming, Snooker and Badminton. Apart from these VIT University has seen a growing trend in video gaming tournaments like Need For Speed, DOTA, Counter Strike, FIFA, Age Of Empires etc.

== Social causes ==
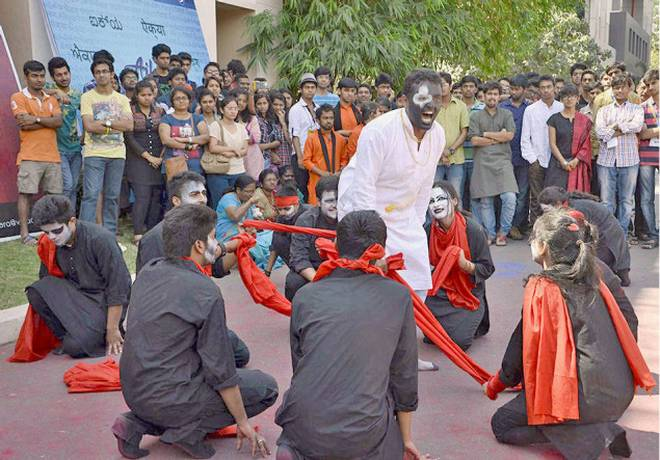
Street Play against child labour, female foeticide and child trafficking

While being a cultural festival, Riviera has also been used as a platform to highlight social issues which plague the world currently. Through the numerous street play events that have been organized by the colleges own dramatics club, numerous social issues such as child labor, female infanticide, and child trafficking. A chapter of Bangalore based NGO Juvenile Care, present at the campus has organized marches which have seen the participation of 200+ students for social issues such as "Save the female child" in 2013 and child trafficking in 2015. A premier event at the festival, VITMUN, a model united nations conference, has also helped highlight social issues and as such has partnered up with UN organizations, with the 2016 iteration teaming up with UN Women for the He for She campaign.

== Awards and recognition ==
Riviera 2011 was the world's first sports and cultural festival to be certified by the International Organization for Standardization (ISO). The festival management passed the requirements for the 9001:2008 certificate for quality management systems. VIT has since been awarded the certificate every year for managerial efficiency shown when conducting Riviera. The festival's 2011 edition also earned a place in the Guinness Book Of World Records for the feat - 'Most number of people arm wrestling'. Students and faculty participated in a bid to make the record as a total of 668 people were counted arm wrestling.

== Media and sponsors ==
The events held by clubs and chapters during Riviera are sponsored mostly by the smaller businesses in and around the VIT campus. Riviera as a whole, though has had (most prominently) Airtel, PepsiCo and Wipro sponsoring a major part of its finances in recent years. Local businesses also like to use the events held as an opportunity for publicity. Other companies that are known to have co-sponsored Riviera are IBM, Lenovo, Cognizant, MGM Dizzee World and Cisco. The organisers of the fest use social media platforms including Twitter and Facebook to publicise and also share event-related information. The management at VIT creates a new Facebook page every year for Riviera. They have also utilized the services of the radio station 'Radio Mirchi' and the daily newspaper 'The Deccan Chronicle' and The Hindu in recent years.
