= Cultural Exchanges festival =

Annual festival in Leicester, England

The Cultural Exchanges festival is an annual cultural festival held at De Montfort University, Leicester, England. The festival started in the year 2000 and is held over five days attracting up to 4,000 people each year.

Many celebrated guests from areas of the arts, media, literature, politics and film have appeared at the festival including Alastair Campbell, Andrew Motion, Alan Yentob, Alan Moore, Sue Townsend, Alan Sillitoe, Ken Loach, Matthew Bourne, Ben Okri, Louis De Bernieres, Billy Bragg, Andrew Davies, Linton Kwesi Johnson, Grayson Perry, Germaine Greer, Trevor Nelson and Lemn Sissay. The main programme is often complemented by workshops, day conferences and performance arts events. The festival director, Tony Graves, recently received the Leicestershire First Award for Achievement in Arts and Music.

Cultural Exchanges Festival 2014 will take place 17–21 February 2014.
