= Technosearch =

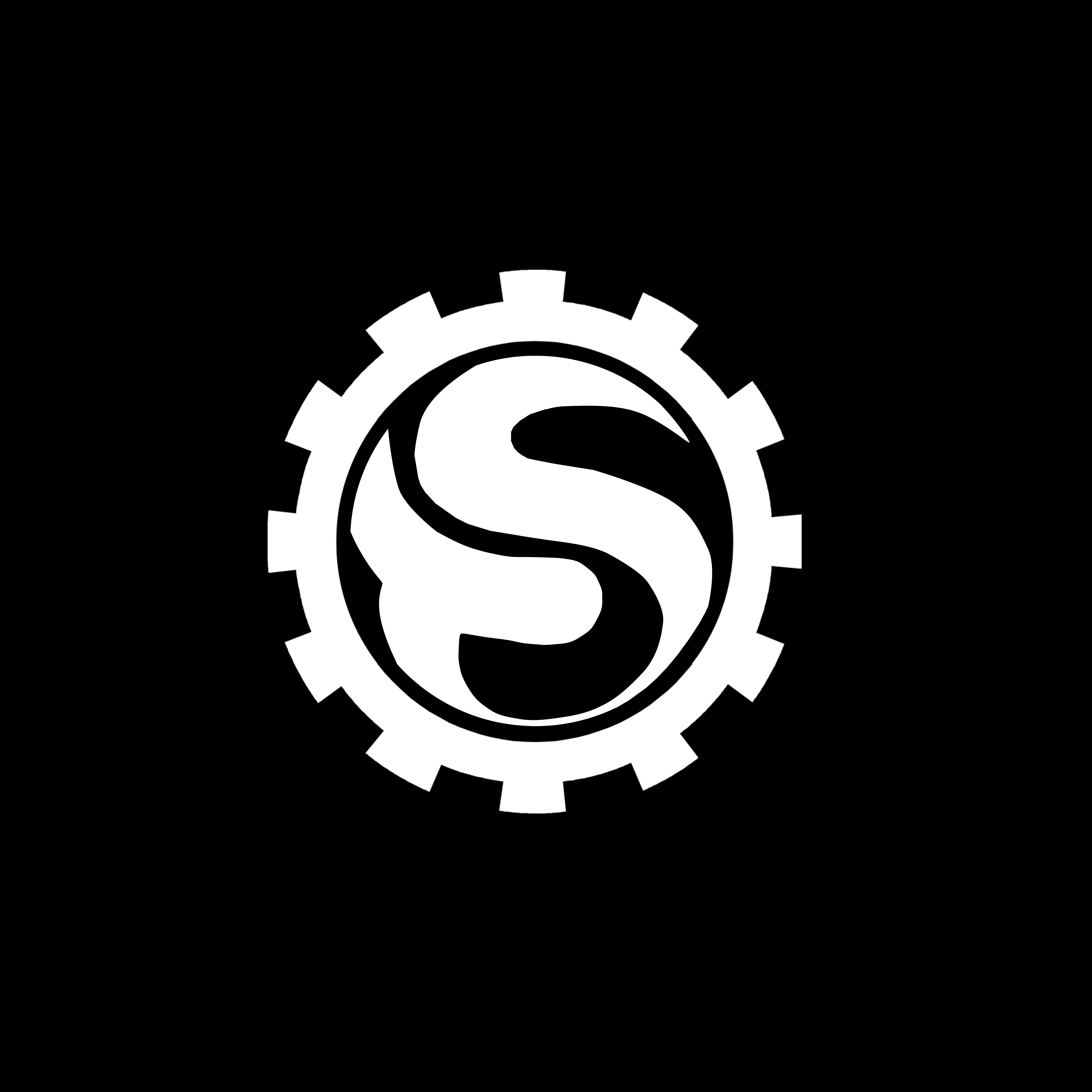

Technosearch is the Annual Technical Festival of MANIT Bhopal. Since its inception in 2003, Technosearch has done lots of technical and cultural events. The participation for Technosearch has been growing exponentially, easily evident from the footfall of over 15000 in the 2017 installment.

Technosearch is studded with workshops, seminars and riveting ProNites to sum up the day's events. TS has had previous rosters of artists like Hardy Sandhu, DJ Carnivore and Siana Catherine. It is one of the largest Technical Fests in Central India.

== History and growth ==
Technosearch started out in 2003 to increase the technical culture of NIT-Bhopal. It aims to generate practical knowledge and instill curiosity and innovation in NIT-Bhopal students. Through the years, Technosearch has enlarged and has now become a very large technical festival in Central India. Technosearch organizes a wide range of contests, workshops and events encompassing different genres of technology with the aim to "infuse a scientific and rational temperament in the young minds."
