= Milan (cultural festival) =

MILAN
- Genre: Cultural
- Dates: 02 - 05 March 2023
- Frequency: Annual
- Venue: SRM Institute of Science and Technology
- Locations: Kattankulathur, Tamil Nadu
- Country: India
- Inaugurated: 2008; 18 years ago
- Attendance: 120,000+ (2020)
- Organiser: Directorate of Student Affairs, SRMIST

Milan (Sanskrit for unification/coming together) is the National-Level Cultural Festival organized by the Directorate of Student Affairs of SRM Institute of Science and Technology. Milan is five day fest with a foray of events that spans extensively over a number of sporting events and multifarious music, dance and art events. Every year in addition to these events, Milan also brings to SRM some top-notch music band performances and Proshows. The 2015 edition of Milan attempted to break the Guinness World Record with 100 hours of continuous events.

== History ==
Milan first began in 2008, beginning with about 25 events. Since then, Milan has grown over the course of time to host over 100 different events of art, dance, music and sports with ever-expanding participation from across the country. Several prominent celebrities including Asha Bhonsle, Mammoothy, Kamal Hassan, Suriya, Vetrimaran, Aditya, Roy Kapoor, Karthick, John Abraham, Vishal and Shekher, Nucleya, Amit Trivedi, Vijay Deverakonda, Yashika Anand, Sorabh Pant, and Rahul Subramainan have appeared at events over the years.

Live band performances and concerts have been major attractions at Milan year after year. There have also been some outstanding stand-up comedy performances by groups such as Evam Tamasha, East India Comedy, and OML. In 2020, Milan commemorated its 13th successful edition at SRM Institute of Science and Technology.

== Events ==
Milan organizes over a 120+ events every year which encompass over a multitude of domains. In the past few years, there have been a set of special events that occur before Milan.

=== Literary events ===
Each year in Milan, a number of literary events like debates, extempore and essay-writing that take place provide a platform to young orators and writers to exhibit their literary skills. Topics range from politics, ethics to environment and technology. These literary events occur in several languages including English, Tamil and Telugu.

=== Funzone ===
Funzone, previously known as Informals, is one of the major attractions for participants of the festival. It involves a variety of events, the major highlights being the treasure-hunt, Mythos D' Aghor, and Milan Roadies, which come with grand cash prizes. The 2017 Milan saw the advent of new games like Man versus Food, Memenia, and Nincompoops.

=== Creativity and Fine Arts ===
This is a domain in which artists participate in events like road graffiti, wall-painting, collage-making and poster-making. Often, these art works represent an underlying theme or social message.

=== Music ===
Music at Milan has ranged from classic events like solo singing and instrumentals to new events like rap battles, Beat-boxing, Acapella, Battle of the Bands, Jugalbandi and so on.

=== Dance ===
Events like Pro Battle, Adapt Tune, Choreonite and Choreonite + feature group and individual dance performances.

=== Colosseum ===
As the official domain for dramatics, Colosseum allows directors, writers and actors to exhibit their creations through short films, script-writing and theatrics.

=== Aeromodelling ===
Aeromodelling enthusiasts design and display their creations.

=== Environment ===
The SRM environment club comes hosts events such as Green Avengers and Ecoshoot among others focusing on the need for sustainability and protection of the environment.

=== Online Events ===
Online events have become more notable, such as Story of My Life and Hashtags.

=== Fashion ===
The SRM hosts the Vogue Way fashion show each year, with collections designed by SRM students.

== Proshows ==
Professional acts that have appeared at Milan in the past include:

- Junkyard Grooves (2008)
- Benny Dayal (2009)
- Karthik (2010)
- Bombay Rockers (2010)
- Shreya Ghoshal (2011)
- Rhythm Dhol Bass (2012)
- Daler Mehndi (2014)
- Tiny Fingers (2015)
- Thaikkudam bridge (2016)
- Devi Sri Prasad (2016)
- DJ Kaila Troy (2016)
- EIC (2017)
- Anushka Manchanda (2017)
- Palak Muchhal (2017)
- Palash Muchhal (2017)
- Vishal Dadlani (2017)
- Shekhar Ravjiani (2017)
- Amit Trivedi (2018)
- Nucleya (2018)
- Vijay Deverakonda (2018)
- Sorabh Pant (2018)
- Rahul Subramanian (2018)
- Rohan Joshi (2019)
- Saurav Mehta (2019)
- Salim–Sulaiman (2019)
- Jonita Gandhi (2019)
- Bassjackers (2019)
- Shruti Haasan (2019)
- Rakul Preet Singh (2020)
- Vidya Vox (2020)
- Divine (rapper) (2020)
- Abish Mathew (2020)
- Nani (2023)
- Diego Miranda (2023)
- KEVU (2023)
- DJ Gowtham (2024)
- DJ Siana Catherine (2024)
- Pradeep Kumar (2024)
- Andrea Jeremiah (2024)
- RAVATOR (2024)
- ΤΗIRD Ξ ΡARTY (2024)
- Neeti Mohan (2024)

== Guest appearances ==
Asha Bhosle, Tamannaah and Reemma Sen were the guests of the inaugural Milan in 2008. In 2009, Padmashri Dr Kamal Haasan was the chief guest. Vijayakanth was the special attraction in 2010. In 2011, M. Balamuralikrishna and Vikram were the guest of honor and chief guest respectively. Vani Jairam, Shriya Saran, Taapsee Pannu were also among the guests that year. In 2012, R. Sarathkumar and Siddharth visited the campus on the first day of Milan, followed by Jiiva, Andrea Jeremiah, Ameer Sultan and Mammootty. In 2016 John Abraham inaugurated Milan and thevaledictory guest was Vetrimaran. In 2017 Aditya Roy Kapoor inaugurated Milan and R. Sarathkumar was the special attraction of Milan 2017. In 2018 Vijay Deverakonda Inaugurated Milan and Amit Trivedi, Nucleya was the special attraction of Milan 2018. The lineup includes the stunning Rakul Preet Singh, the multi-talented Vidya Vox, the dynamic Lost Stories, the electrifying Dj SA, the charismatic Rapper Divine, the talented Nivetha Thomas, and the dashing Siddharth. Milan 2023 featured notable guests from the Tollywood film industry, including popular actor Nani, and musician Karthik. The event also saw the attendance of international talents such as DJ Diego Miranda and KEVU. Furthermore, the cast and crew of the Tamil movie Parundhaaguthu Oor Kuruvi, featuring Vivek Prasanna, actor Kavin from movie Dada attended the event.

== Butterflies ==
Butterflies is a social initiative undertaken by SRM University which aims to aid the under-privileged school children in and around the Kancheepuram district, Tamil Nadu. The program strives to provide education children and thereby help them overcome social issues they are subjected to and to prevent early school dropouts. In an attempt to share the joy and happiness that Milan stood for, Butterflies came into being. Hosted with a tagline ‘Inspiring Change’, Butterflies continues to be a huge step in the campaign that aims at giving back joy to the society.

Every year children studying in government schools from Kancheepuram district, Tamil Nadu are invited to compete in cultural, literary, sports and other events. Winners are awarded with prizes and medals. The school with the maximum points and participation in maximum number of events is awarded the ‘Best School Trophy’. Breakfast and lunch are provided to the children and their accompanying staff members along with a souvenir and certificate. Transportation is provided for the children from and to their schools on the day. In 2012, Butterflies unveiled its School Adoption Program, which focuses on educating the students in various fields including computer skills, spoken English, extra-curricular activities and academics.

== Hospitality ==
During Milan, SRM University provides accommodation to non-local students. The food stalls during Milan provide a wide platter of cuisines in one place and are a huge hit among students. Participants from other colleges are provided complete guidance about the means of transportation and routes to University by the Hospitality Domain.

== Organising ==
=== Milan'23 ===
Milan 2023 was a four-day event organized by the Directorate of Student Affairs (DSA) from 2 March 2023 to 5 March 2023. The event comprised several shows and the inaugural event that took place on 2 March at 2.00 PM. The tickets were classified into three categories: ₹1000, ₹750, and ₹250. The ₹1000 ticket granted access to all the shows and the inaugural event, while the ₹750 ticket provided access to most of the events, excluding the inaugural event and specific shows. The ₹250 ticket was mandatory for every participant in the event.

To manage ticketing for the event, Team Milan created a new website from scratch. However, when the tickets went live, the site could not handle the high demand, resulting in server crashes. Some students managed to purchase tickets, while others were unable to do so. Team Milan promptly addressed this issue and provided an alternative payment link. The updated ticket costs were ₹1277 and ₹885. The ₹250 tickets remained available on Milan's official website.

On the day of the inaugural event, many students had been waiting in queues for their passes since morning. Despite multiple changes in pass issue venues, the crowds continued to gather and wait for their passes. However, the queues were not adequately managed by the team, and those who were last in line remained there for hours. Meanwhile, others who went straight to the counter managed to get their tickets within minutes. Additionally, there was no ticket checking at the entrances of the events, resulting in a massive crowd rushing into the T.P Ganesan Auditorium to attend the inaugural event where Nani was present. Consequently, the auditorium quickly filled up, and many people who had purchased the ₹1000 ticket and should have attended the inaugural event missed out because others without tickets had rushed in.

Despite the chaotic start, the situation improved somewhat for the events on 2 March, thanks to the help of the Police Force of Tambaram Circle. However, the lack of proper ticket checking remained an issue throughout the event. On 5 March, the venue for Sundeep Sharma's comedy night was changed from the auditorium to the ground at short notice. Fortunately, there was no ruckus for the event on the last day since there were fewer attendees.

In conclusion, Milan 2023 was a value-for-money event, although attendees could enter the event without purchasing a ticket. The organizers should have managed the queues and ticket checking better, especially for the inaugural event, to avoid overcrowding and ensure that those who purchased higher-priced tickets could attend the events they paid for.
