= Aarohi Pandit =

Indian pilot

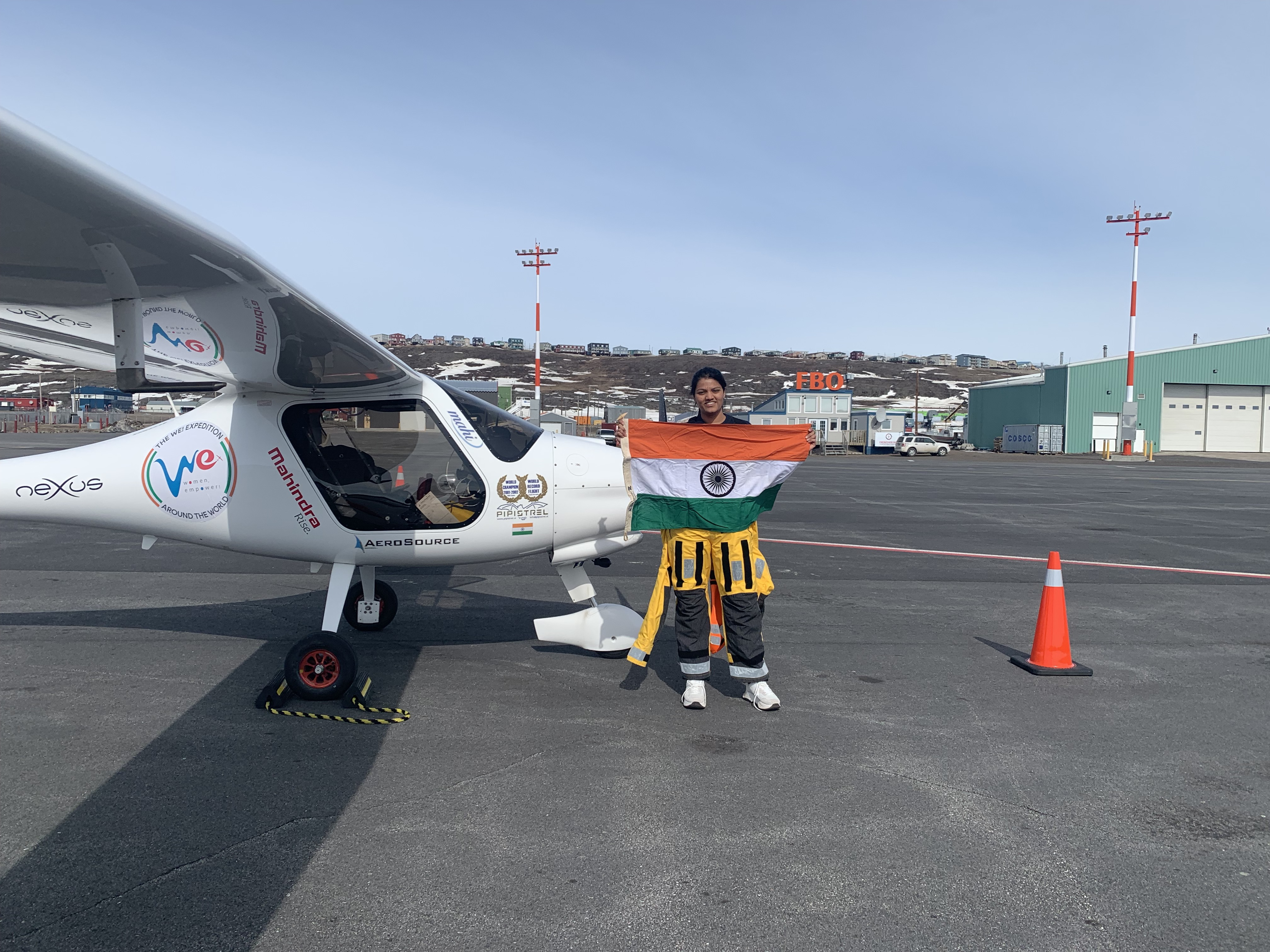
- Born: February 10, 1996 (age 30)
- Occupation: Pilot
- Title: First woman pilot and the youngest in the world to fly solo across the Atlantic and the Pacific Ocean on a light-sport aircraft.

Aarohi Pandit (born 10 February 1996) is an Indian pilot. In 2019, she became the world's first woman pilot and the youngest pilot-at the age of 23-to cross the Atlantic Ocean and the Pacific Ocean solo in a light sport aircraft.

== Early life ==
Arohi was born on 10 February 1996 in Gujarat and brought up in the state of Maharashtra.

== Record making flights ==
She embarked on the journey along with her co-pilot on July 30, 2018, taking off from Patiala, India and flying to 27 stops at Pakistan, Iran, Turkey, Serbia, Slovenia, Germany, France, UK, and Iceland. On September 6, 2018, she began the solo phase of the WE! The expedition, in which she set four world records. She became the first woman in the world to fly across the Atlantic Ocean from Scotland to Canada with stops at Hofn and Reykjavik in Iceland, and Kulusuk and Nuuk in Greenland, landing at Iqaluit, Canada on May 13, 2019. Along the way, she also became the first woman in the world to fly over the treacherous Greenland icecap in a light-sport aircraft, on May 4, 2019. Thereafter, her journey across Canada, all the way from Iqaluit in the North East to the South, and the West and North along the Rockies into Alaska, negotiating with strong winds and forest fires in 22 flights over 9 Canadian provinces, made for another world first. On August 21, 2019, she flew the Pipistrel Sinus 912 over the mighty Pacific Ocean nonstop from Nome, Alaska to Anadyr in Far East Russia, setting a world record.

== Career ==
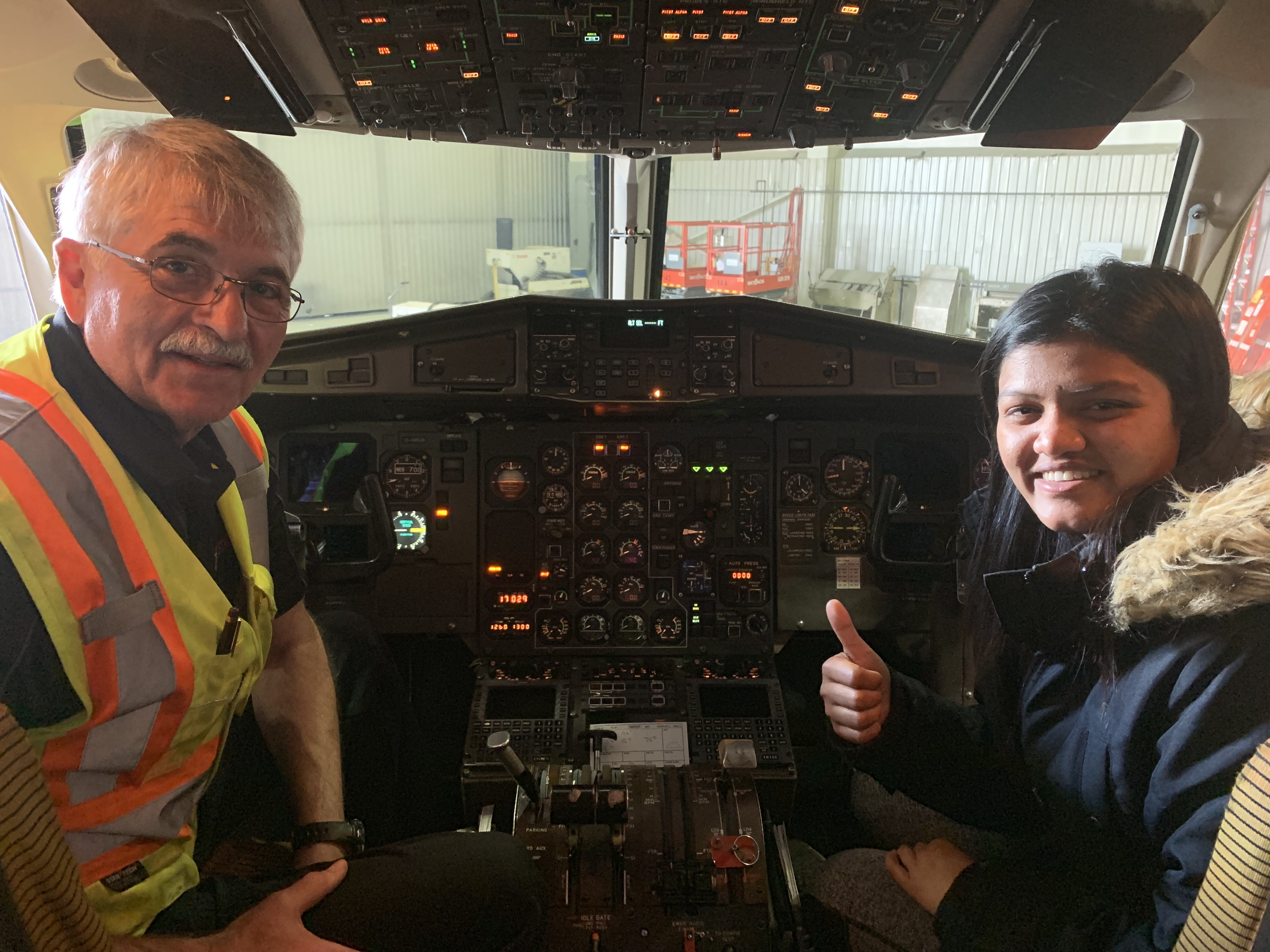
Iqaluit Airport 2019, Q400

After completing her schooling at the age of 17, she enrolled at The Bombay Flying, College of Aviation (BFC), the flying school in Maharashtra. Aarohi's career began at the age of 21 when she was selected for the Women Empowerment Expedition round-the-world portion on a light-sport aircraft. She traveled in an ultralight Pipistrel Sinus 912. Pandit is the first woman in the world to fly solo across the Atlantic and the Pacific Ocean in a light-sport aircraft. Aarohi also set a world record for flying across the second-largest ice sheet on the planet, the Greenland ice sheet.

Currently, she holds four world records :

1. First woman pilot to fly solo across the Atlantic Ocean in a light sport aircraft.
2. First woman pilot to fly solo across the Pacific Ocean in a light sport aircraft.
3. First woman pilot to fly solo across the Greenland ice caps on a light sport aircraft.
4. First woman pilot to carry a cross country flight across Canada in a light sport aircraft.

On October 15, 2021, Captain Aarohi Pandit, touched down in her plane - VT NBF, a Pipistrel Sinus 912 weighing only 330 kg, at Juhu, India's first civil airport.

Her flight from the Bhuj runaway was historic in many ways. She was re-enacting India's first commercial flight flown by JRD Tata in 1932 and paying tribute to the women of Madhapar who had rebuilt the Bhuj runway within 72 hours during the India-Pakistan war.

Pandit had to navigate the plane without GPS, autopilot, or computerised equipment, always flying 7,000 feet above mean sea level.

Operating the same route from Kutch to Mumbai, with less than 60 litres of petrol for an estimated five hours of flying over the 500 nautical mile distance, Aarohi also carried a special letter from the 1971 Indo-Pak war women heroes of Madhapar village in Gujarat to the young women of suburban villages, in Mumbai, Maharashtra, recalling the 25 kg of mails that JRD Tata carried on his flight.

== Awards and recognition ==
In July 2019, Pandit was awarded by ABP Majha Sanman Puraskar – Young Achiever Category.

In November 2019, Aeronautical society of Indian awarded Pandit for her exemplary achievement. In February 2020, Pandit was awarded Uma Jain Award 2020 for Young Women Achiever by the prestigious Rotary Club Of Bombay.

In March 2020, Pandit was also felicitated for ABP Shakti Samman Award by Smt. Smriti Irani – Ministry of Women and Child Development.

== Sources ==
1. Aarohi Pandit Scripts History, Becomes World's 1st Woman To Fly Solo Over Atlantic & Pacific Ocean
2. Flying High
3. Mumbai Girl First in the World to Cross Atlantic Ocean in LSA
4. Meet Aarohi Pandit, Mumbai girl who became world's first pilot to cross Atlantic Ocean
5. Majha Sanman | विविध क्षेत्रातील रत्नांचा एबीपी माझाकडून गौरव | ABP Majha
6. Aarohi Pandit – The world’s first woman pilot to cross both Atlantic and Pacific Ocean
