= SaMMsCRIthi =

Annual festival of the Mysore Medical College in India

- Status: Active
- Genre: Inter-college Fest
- Begins: October 1, 2023
- Ends: October 5, 2023
- Frequency: Annually
- Venue: J. K. Grounds
- Location: Mysore
- Years active: 14
- Participants: All medical colleges in Karnataka, all degree colleges in Mysore
- Major events: Cultural, Sports, Academic
- Website: sammscrithivagus23.com

saMMsCRIthi is the annual fest of Mysore Medical College & Research Institute, Mysore. It is conducted at Jeevarayana Katte Grounds, popularly known as J.K. Grounds.

== History ==
The event, a cultural extravaganza, has been known by various names since its inception in the year 2000. It was called InFest, Parivartan 2010, Abhivyakth 2011, etc. before it was decided in 2012 that the festival would be permanently named saMMsCRIthi reflecting the college name within.

== Significance ==
This festival attracts crowds during the Mysore Dasara. It functions as an awareness drive for health and illnesses. It is the second largest festival among medical schools in the state of Karnataka, and witnesses participation from all the medical colleges of the state.

== Theme ==
Every year, a theme is chosen for the festival. In 2014, the theme was Diabetes Mellitus. In 2015, it is organ donation.

== See also ==
- Mysore Medical College & Research Institute
