= DJ NYK =

DJ, Music Productions

- Born: Nikhil Sahni; Delhi, India
- Education: Delhi University
- Occupations: DJ, music producer
- Years active: 2004 - Present
- Website: https://www.djnyk.com/

Nikhil Sahni also known as DJ NYK is an Indian DJ, music producer, radio host, VJ, music career coach, and label owner at Play Life records. He is widely known for his Bollywood remixes, mashups, and his live sets in locations like Lake Pichola and Kerala backwaters.

== Early life ==
Born and raised in New Delhi, India, DJ NYK completed his education from Delhi University and started his journey in the clubs of the Indian capital. He was influenced by music at an early age and started producing songs as well as remixes in high school before getting into DJing.

== Career ==
DJ NYK started DJing in 2003 and he got his first job as a resident DJ at Club Moets in New Delhi in 2004. While he continued to resident at other clubs in the city as well, he simultaneously worked on producing remixes, which he kept uploading on the internet on two popular music platforms called coolgoose.com & djluv.in. DJ NYK landed his first professional gig at the age of 20. His big break came in 2006 when an organiser in Hong Kong invited him to perform as a guest DJ for their event.

Through the Electronyk Show, NYK asserted himself as the first artist to introduce Video-DJ’ing (VDJ’ing) in India.

His incursion into Bollywood was one of the principal breakthroughs in his career when he did a remix for Shah Rukh Khan starrer "Billu". Since then, he has commissioned several official remixes for over 20 different Bollywood films. NYK has also done official mixes for Danish Pop duo Bombay Rockers and Nindy Kaur. His official remix of Aye Khuda from the movie "Paathshaala" was no.1 position on the domestic radio charts. NYK's remix of the hit track " Chammak Challo", sung by international pop star Akon, was featured on Ra.One's PlayStation, which made him first Indian DJ to REMIX a track for PlayStation video game.

DJ NYK hosted his own radio show called 'Rock The Party' on 94.3 MY FM back in 2011 and then another show, 'Saturday Night Fever with DJ NYK' on Fever 104 FM that aired pan India in 2018 and 2019.

NYK’s first official international remix – "Haze" – was released on Gold Records (Canada), and drew support from international superstar Gareth Emery who featured it on his weekly podcast. His original productions have been released internationally on Progressive Groove Records (Canada), Pearlicks Records (Miami), and LAD Records; and have also been aired and featured prominently on the BBC Asian Network .

DJ NYK also performed alongside Salman Khan, Kriti Sanon, Sonakshi Sinha, Daisy Shah, and Prabhu Deva for their Dabangg Tour concert in New Delhi. He also played at the Club MTV party and MTV Bollyland in India.

On 24 December 2021, DJ NYK performed at Dubai Expo 2020 held at the Dubai Millennium Amphitheatre.

He won the Vh1 MyFav Awards 3 times for "Best Bollywood DJ".

== Discography ==
=== Original Singles ===
Name	Label	Year
Amber	Progressive Grooves Records	2009
Calling	Progressive Grooves Records	2009
Estimulente	Progressive Grooves Records	2009
Living Kings	Play Life Records	2016
Wild Horses	Play Life Records	2017
Remember You	Play Life Records	2019
Calm The World	Play Life Records	2020
BLING	Play Life Records	2020
PIYA	Play Life Records	2021

=== Bollywood Remixes ===
Song	Movie	Music label	Year
Love Mera Hit Hit	Billu Barber	T-Series	2009
Dhun Lagi	Jai Veeru	T-Series	2009
Khuda Ke Liye	Runway	T-Series	2009
Baamulaiza	De Dana Dan	Venus	2009
Aye Khuda	Paathshaala	T-Series	2010
Desi Kali	Golmaal 3	T-Series	2010
Chammak Challo	Ra.One	T-Series	2011
Cut To Disco	Rocking Dard E Disco	SareGama	2012
Mera Mann Kehne Laga	Nautanki Saala	T-Series	2013
Aao Na	I Love New Year	T-Series	2013
Dilliwaali Girlfriend	Yeh Jawani Hai Deewani	T-Series	2013
Hai Ye Dil Mera	Hate Story 2	T-Series	2014
Meherbani	The Shaukeens	Zee Music	2014
Abhi Toh Party Shuru	Khoobsurat	T-Series	2014
Enna Sona	Ok Jaanu	Sony Music	2017
Tera Yaar Hoon Main	Sonu Ke Titu Ki Sweety	T-Series	2018
Ishq Di Baajiyan	Soorma	Sony Music	2018
Sawarne Lage	Mitron	Sony Music	2018
Title Song - Ek Ladki Ko Dekha	Ek Ladki Ko Dekha Toh	SareGama	2019
Burj Khalifa	Laxmii	Zee Music	2021

=== Pop/Indie Remixes ===
Song	Artist	Label	Year
Pulse	Kay Mikado	LAD Publishing & Records	2010
Haze	Mikas	Gold Series Records	2010
Dreams	Teenu Arora	Pearlicka Records	2012
Kya Baat Ay	Harrdy Sandhu	Sony Music	2018
Dream Girl	Ir Sais	Sony Music	2019
G.O.A.T	Diljit Doshanjh	Famous Studios	2020
O Sanam (LoFi Remix)	Lucky Ali	Sony Music	2021
Party Mashup 2021	Various Artists	Sony Music	2021
