= Moksha (festival) =

Moksha, NSUT
- Genre: Cultural
- Frequency: Annual
- Venue: Netaji Subhas University of Technology
- Location: Delhi
- Country: India
- Inaugurated: 2003; 23 years ago
- Filing status: Student Run, non-Profit Organisation
- Website: www.mokshansut.com

Moksha is an annual cultural festival at the Netaji Subhas University of Technology (NSUT), started in 2003.

== Popularity ==
Some events of Moksha are also featured on popular TV and radio channels. Moksha witnesses a footfall of more than 50,000 every year at events and competitions. The events "Mudra" and "Rouge" undergo various selection rounds to pick the best four for the finale. MTV as a Media Partner, with Video Jockey Gaelyn have covered various events. Akcent had been present at the festival on 2014.

In 2023 it witnessed more than 1.5 lakh attendees and was headlined by Divine (rapper), Asees Kaur, and Vishal-Shekhar.

== Main attractions ==
- 2003 – Euphoria
- 2004 – KK
- 2006 – Ali Azmat
- 2007 – Kailash Kher
- 2008 – Jal
- 2009 – Mohit Chauhan
- 2010 – Javed Ali, Bohemia (rapper)
- 2011 – Strings
- 2012 – KK
- 2013 – Sunburn Campus
- 2014 – Akcent
- 2015 – Edward Maya, Sachin–Jigar, Nucleya
- 2016 – Shaan, Tomorrowland DJ's, Zaeden, Nina & Mallika
- 2017 – Jasleen Royal
- 2018 – Monali Thakur
- 2019 – Mashd N Kutcher, Indian Ocean, Salim–Sulaiman
- 2022 – KK
- 2023 – Vishal–Shekhar, Asees Kaur, Divine (rapper)
- 2024 – Sunidhi Chauhan, King, Raftaar
- 2025 – Salim-Sulaiman, Darshan Raval
- 2026 – Amit Mishra, Harrdy Sandhu
