= Qurain Cultural Festival =

National arts festival in Kuwait

The Qurain Cultural Festival is Kuwait's leading arts festival, founded in 1994. It is sponsored by the National Council for Culture, Arts and Letters, Kuwait and its purpose is to enhance the artistic and cultural movement in Kuwait. It includes theatre performances, literary events, the exhibitions of the visual arts and other cultural events.

== Prizes ==
The festival is also the venue for the awarding of several arts prizes. These include the literature prizes, education prizes and in the painting category - the State's Encouragement Prize.
