= BM Habitat Mall =

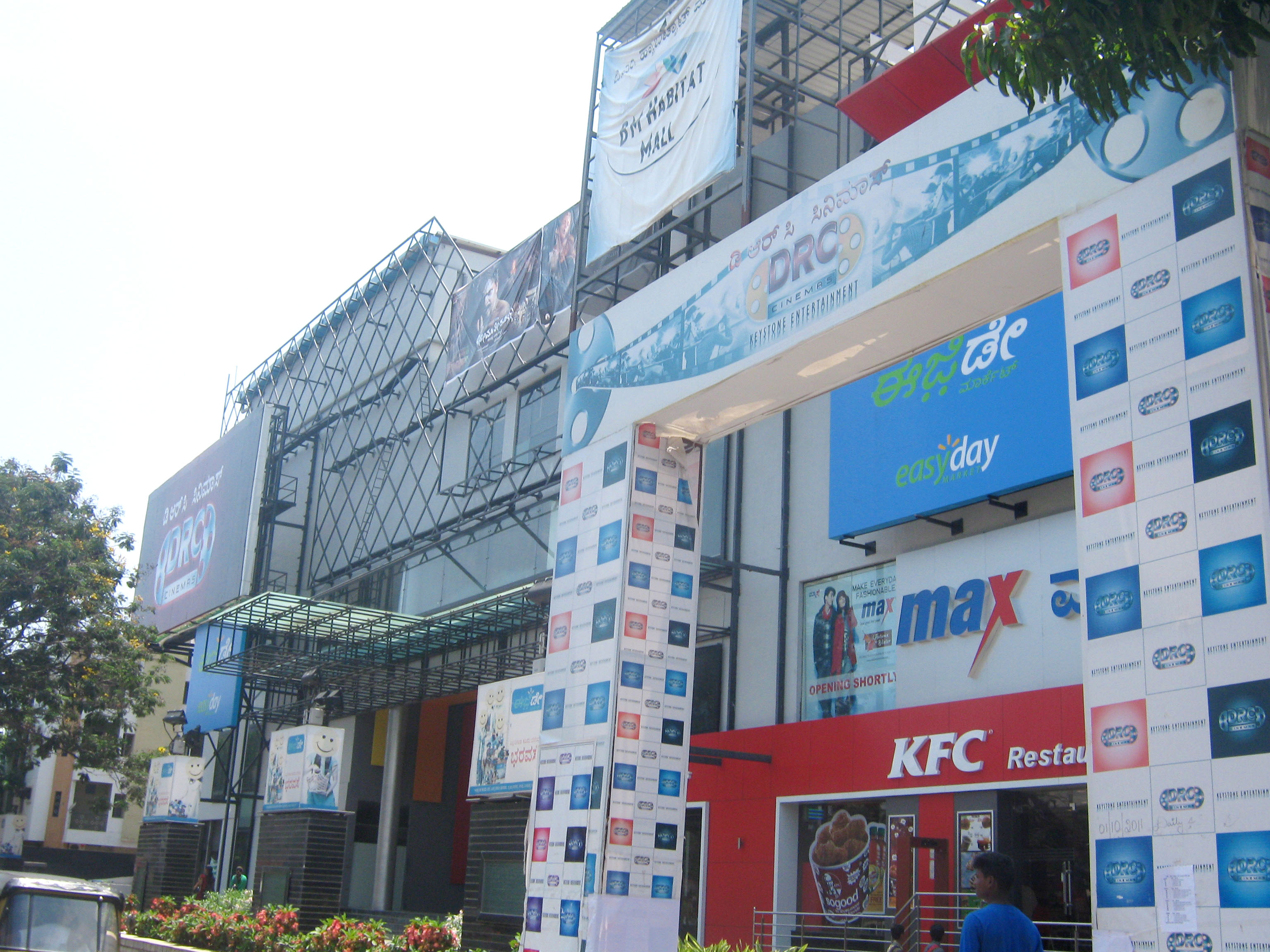
- BM Habitat Mall, exterior view
- Location: Mysore, Karnataka, India
- Coordinates: 12.321413°N 76.620736°E
- Address: Next to BM Hospital, Jayalakshmipuram
- Opened: 1 October 2011
- Developer: Urban Oasis Real Estates
- Num. of stores: 30+
- Floor area: 36,000 sq ft (3,300 m^{2})
- Floors: 4
- Parking: 500 approx.

BM Habitat Mall is a shopping mall in the Indian city of Mysore, Karnataka. It is located behind the BM hospital in Jayalakshmipuram.

== About the mall ==
It houses DRC Cinemas, the city's first multiplex, with four screens. The first Easyday Supermarket (Bharti Enterprises Group) in South India opened at BM Habitat Mall Mysore. The space has been occupied by Big Bazaar which is now known as Smart Bazaar. Some of the branded merchandise establishments in the mall include Reliance Digital, Apple imagine, Max and Chemmanur international Jewelers - their 1st showroom in Karnataka and 47th branch internationally. Branded eateries such as KFC (Kentucky Fried Chicken), Burger King, and Popeyes - their first outlet in Mysore are located in this mall.

Inside the BM Habitat Mall

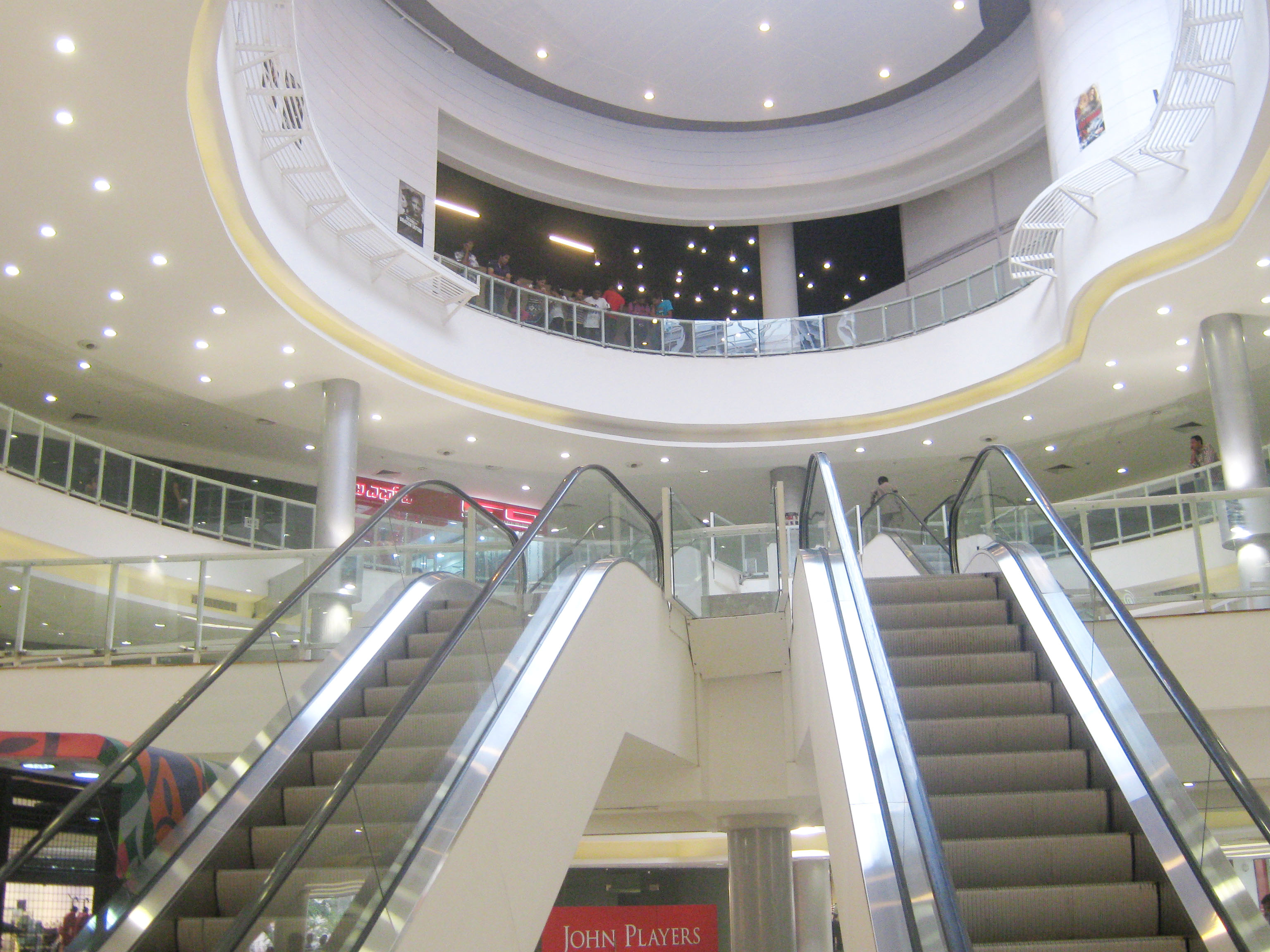
View from the ground floor

== See also ==
- Easyday
- List of shopping malls in India
