= Abeyaantrix =

Annual technical festival in Assam, India

- Genre: Student organised, Non-Profit Techno-Cultural Festival
- Locations: Jorhat, Assam, India
- Founded: 2011 (15 years ago)
- Attendance: approx 100,000 (2015)
- Major events: Robotics, Workshops, Quiz, Debate, Games, Fashion Show, Cultural Night, etc
- Sponsor: Jorhat Institute of Science & Technology

Abeyaantrixis the National Level Annual Technical Festival of Jorhat Institute of Science & Technology, Assam, India. It is one of the common platforms in North-East India to showcase knowledge and intellect. A blend of different technical and cultural events, it has social events as well. Abeyaantrix attracts enthusiasts from various parts of India. It is one of those technical festivals of North-East India, which reaches out to both engineering and non-engineering students. It is sometimes abbreviated as Abx in social networking websites. The latest addition of Abeyaantrix was 2016 held from 24 to 26 March 2016.

== Etymology ==
The name Abeyaantrix is derived from Sanskrit word "अभियांत्रिकी" which means engineering. The root word is "अभियंता" in Sanskrit/Hindi or "অভিযন্তা" in Assamese which means engineer.

== Jorhat Institute of Science and Technology ==
Jorhat Institute of Science & Technology (formerly Science College, Jorhat) was established in the year 1971. It is the premier technical institute of North East India located in the Sotai area of Jorhat town. At first it was a general B.Sc. college. In 2009, Bachelor of Engineering(B.E.) course was introduced. It is the third undergraduate govt.engineering college in Assam and today is a premier technical institute of the entire country. JIST has been the hub of many academic and supplementary activities in Assam for almost half a century. The college is approved by the All India Council for Technical Education (AICTE). The college offers Bachelor courses BE in the fields of Electronics and Telecommunication Engineering, Power Electronics Instrumentation Engineering and BSc Degree in Physics, Chemistry, Mathematics and Information Technology. All the courses are affiliated to Dibrugarh University, the education hub of the North East region.

== Events ==
=== Technophilia ===
Technophilia is the annual mega technical event Abeyaantrix as well as JIST. Technophilia is a combination of two words – Techno and Philia. Techno refers Technology and Philia means "to love". The technology lovers are called Technophilia. Main events of Technophilia are :

- Robowar
- Robo: Tug of War
- Platform racing
- Workshops

=== Nerve Blast ===
Nerve Blast, the open Quiz competition of Abeyaantrix, is a competition where quizzers from entire Assam compete for the title of winner.

=== Rebel o Rock ===
Rebel o Rock, the open metal rock band competition of Abeyaantrix, is a competition where metal bands from entire Northeast as well as other states of India take part. All the JISTians as well as the students from various institutes of the Northeast region attend this event.

=== Nandaka-War of Words ===
Nandaka the open debate competition is also one of the events among many others in Abeyaantrix which is organized to develop political and social consciousness and to know the perspective of different viewers.

=== Speak Up ===
Speak Up is a speech competition where we try to learn the views, complement on some social, political or any topic of national interest.

== Mayaan ==
Mayaan is the souvenir publication of Abeyaantrix. It is published annually by team Abeyaantrix to commemorate the events held during the fest. Mainly it is released at the inauguration ceremony of Abeyaantrix in the presence of the guests. Mayaan contains articles poems etc. by the students of JIST. It also includes writings from the faculty members of the institute. The souvenir also publishes writings by guest writers.

Mayaan is a Hebrew word which means fountain. Hence the basic idea behind choosing this name was to represent A Fountain of Knowledge.
