= Zest (festival) =

Annual inter-collegiate youth festival

- Genre: Cultural
- Begins: In the month of October
- Frequency: Annual
- Locations: Lingaya's University, Faridabad, Haryana, India
- Years active: 28
- Inaugurated: 1998
- Participants: 1500
- Attendance: 10000
- This is a College festival.

Zest is an inter-collegiate youth festival in Haryana, India, hosted annually by the students of Lingaya's University, Faridabad.

Zest began in 1998. The fest includes events cultural contests in literary, performing arts and fine arts categories, along with a number of other activities on different themes.

The festival is completely managed, organized and run by the workforce which consists of 300 volunteers and members of different committees head.

== Theme ==
Each year, the festival follows a specific theme. The theme for the year 2011 was "UDAY - Youth at its best". The theme for the year 2012 was "Maaya Illusion". The theme for 2013 was "Manthan - To Excel", which is a popular phrase, The theme for 2014 was "Navrasa", The theme for 2015 (Feb) was "Rang Manch, The theme for 2015 was "Sanskriti". This time the theme of Zest 2016 is "Freedom"

== Attractions ==
Main centre of attractions are the Stars which are invited to perform on the Star Night:

This time Meet Brothers will perform.

Previously, the Stars who performed on the star nights of zest were:

1)Mika Singh 2) Neha Kakkar 3) Daler Mehandi 4) Hard Kaur 5) Jassi Sidhu 6) Master Saleem 7) Shefali Alvares 8) Anushka Manchanda and many more...........

Another attraction is the Inauguration of the Zest, which is done by the veteran actors of Bollywood industry:

This time Gulshan Grover will inaugurate the Zest 2016.

Previously, Zest was inaugurated by:

1) Rajesh Khanna 2) Ranjeet 3) Shakti Kapoor 4) Aditya Pancholi 5) Zarina Wahab 6) Padmini Kolhapure 7) Asrani and many more...........

=== Mr and Ms Zest ===
Mr and Ms Zest is the talent contest to find the ultimate festival entertainer. It looks for talent, originality and sense of humour. The winners are crowned reigning king and queen of the festival.

=== Bollywood Dance ===
In this event contestants show their dancing prowess and tap to popular Bollywood tunes.

=== Street Dance ===
Contestants showcase street styles like Hip-Hop, Krumping and B-boying. The dance performances are based on the theme of the festival.

=== Band Event ===
Bands from different colleges compete to play different kinds of genres.
