= Cultural festival (India) =

Cultural event organized by colleges in India

In India, a cultural festival, cultfest, culfest or college fest is an annual cultural event at a college or university organised by the student community, involving participants from other colleges as well. Professional performing artists are also typically invited, and a number of competitions are held for students. Fests are usually funded through sponsors, although some colleges have begun exploring the idea of crowdfunding.

== General format ==
Most college culfests last between two and five days. The events in a culfest can be broadly classified into four sections:

Literary events

Literary events usually include quizzes, word games, creative writing and some form of public speaking or debate.

Cultural events

These include such competitions as music, dance, fine arts and drama.

Professional events

One or more professionally staged entertainment programs may be scheduled.

Gaming events

Video games and board games may be played.

== See also ==
- List of cultural festivals in Indian colleges
- List of cultural and technical festivals in IITs and NITs
