= Abhishek Ray =

Indian film composer

- Born: Kolkata, West Bengal, India
- Occupations: Playback singer, film composer, wildlife conservationist, filmmaker
- Years active: 2012–present
- Labels: Sony Music; Saregama; Times Music; Zee Music Company; T-Series
- Website: abhishekray.business.site

Abhishek Ray is an Indian film composer, playback singer, instrumentalist, music arranger, and producer working in Bollywood. He is known for having composed the music and done playback vocals for popular and award-winning Bollywood films such as: Paan Singh Tomar, Welcome Back, Saheb, Biwi Aur Gangster, Wedding Anniversary, I Am Kalam, Shagird, Chaar Din Ki Chandni, Prem Mayee, Thoondil, Yeh Saali Zindagi, and Tera Kya Hoga Johnny. Apart from original music, his wildlife preservation and restoration efforts have been recognised across the world and he has been recently awarded with the '"Swabhiman Bharat "' for rewilding an entire hill as wild tiger-leopard corridor. Ray is known to have invested all his savings in creating the famous Sitabani Wildlife Reserve, India's first private wildlife reserve with wild tiger and leopard presence and home to about 350 bird species.

Ray has composed and sung for solo albums like Udaas Paani, Raat Chand Aur Main, Kab aate ho with the legendary poet Gulzar. In May 2016, he launched a music label called AR Productions with a set of seven classic singles written by the lyricist Gulzar featuring singers like Shreya Ghoshal, Hariharan, Alka Yagnik, Abhijeet Bhattacharya, Udit Narayan and Kavita Krishnamurthy. Ray has many other world music albums to his credit like Jaisalmer-Call of the desert, Symphonies of the Taj, Echoes of Khajuraho, Ritu: The Magic of the Six Indian Seasons,Raga Rendezvous.

He composed "Aye Jahaan Aasmaan", the concerto of love with a hundred piece live orchestra and the voices of Sonu Nigam and Shreya Ghoshal. This song won the best song of the year at Mirchi Music Awards 2017 and his song Yeh Dil Ajeeb Hai written by Gulzar and sung by Hariharan simultaneously won the nomination in the same category.

He has also composed music for numerous documentaries like The Maharaja Of Jodhpur: The Legacy Lives On for which he received the 2006 Indian Telly Award for best Music. Others include The Shiamans Of The Himalayas, Apatanis of Arunachal Pradesh, Forced to Kill, and Nirvana for the Discovery Channel. He began his career composing and singing for TV shows and advertisements.

Ray sings, composes, arranges, and mixes his songs and film scores. He works out of his recording studios in Versova, Andheri, Mumbai and Asiad Village, New Delhi. He plays instruments including the piano, electronic keyboards, accordion, wavedrum, conga, thumba, darbouka, electronic drum, and bass.

Ray is also a naturalist and a bonafide government tiger and leopard tracker. He runs his own wildlife reserve next to Corbett National Park called the Sitabani Wildlife Reserve. He is known to have invested all that he earned from Bollywood into rewilding an entire barren hill into dense forest. Today Sitabani Wildlife Reserve is known for wild Bengal tiger and Leopard presence.

He is also the composer singer of India's national anthem on tiger conservation.

== Filmography ==
=== Films ===
Year	Film	Notes
2023	Bengal 1947	
2022	Life's Good	
2017	Wedding Anniversary	
2016	Saat Uchakkey	
2015	Welcome Back	
2012	Paan Singh Tomar	
2012	Chaar Din Ki Chandni	
2012	Prem Mayee	
2011	Saheb, Biwi Aur Gangster	
2011	Shagird	
2011	Yeh Saali Zindagi	
2010	I Am Kalam	
2009	Tera Kya Hoga Johnny	
2008	Thoondil	Tamil film
2006	Ahista Ahista	
2003	Haasil	

== Non film albums ==
Year	Album	Comments	Label
2021	"Ranjo Gham"	with Gulzar	AR Productions
2021	"Wanderer"	with Shreya Ghoshal	AR Productions
2021	"Kaise-The music of goodbye"	with Pratibha Baghel	AR Productions
2021	"Bismil"	with Anwesha	AR Productions
2021	"Reshmii Dhaagey"	with Anwesha	AR Productions
2021	"Yeh Baarishey"	with Annkita	AR Productions
2021	"Jaane Gaya Dil Kahaan"	Single	AR Productions
2021	"Dhaagey"	with Pratibha Baghel	AR Productions
2021	"Mehki-Mehki"	with Annkita	AR Productions
2020	"Athrangee"	with Shreya Ghoshal	AR Productions
2020	"Pulse EP"	with Shreya Ghoshal	AR Productions
2020	"Ilzaam"	with Pratibha Baghel	AR Productions
2020	"Badali"	with Annkita	AR Productions
2020	"Royi Royi"	with Aaria	AR Productions
2019	"Meghaa"	with Shreya Ghoshal, Gulzar	AR Productions
2019	"Emeralds EP"	with Shreya Ghoshal	AR Productions
2019	"Moha"	with Shaan	AR Productions
2019	"Tasavvur"	with Anwesha	AR Productions
2019	"Badra Hua Man"	with Shaan	AR Productions
2019	"Tum Chalna"	with Aaria	AR Productions
2019	"Lady"	with Shreya Ghoshal	AR Productions
2019	"Aanch Lagi"	with Anwesha	AR Productions
2019	"Raat Mujhe Unplugged"	with Shreya Ghoshal	Single
2018	"Chalki Chalki"	with Shaan	AR Productions
2018	"Jismojaan"	with Shreya Ghoshal	AR Productions
2018	"Ujli Ujli"	with Shaan	AR Productions
2018	"Sochona Rokona"	with Shreya Ghoshal	AR Productions
2018	"Aye Jahaan Aasmaan Trance Reprise"	with Shreya Ghoshal	AR Productions
2018	"Chulbula"	with Ankita	AR Productions
2018	"Earth Voices"	with Shreya Ghoshal	AR Productions
2018	"Manbasiyaan"	with Anwesha	AR Productions
2018	"Dushwaari"	with Anwesha	AR Productions
2018	"Resha Resha"	with Kavita Krishnamurthy	AR Productions
2018	"Yaadon Ke Panchi"	with Anwesha	AR Productions
2017	"Reshmi Dhaage"	with Anwesha	AR Productions
2017	"Larzish"	with Anwesha	AR Productions
2017	"Sukha Patta"	with Anwesha	AR Productions
2018	"Kuch Thikana Nahi"	with Anwesha	AR Productions
2018	"Bandagi"	Single	AR Productions
2017	"Sapney Suhaaney"	with Kavita Krishnamurthy	AR Productions
2016	Aye Jahaan Aasmaan	with Sonu Nigam, Shreya Ghoshal	AR Productions
2016	"Jhine-Jhine"	with Kavita Krishnamurthy	AR Productions
2016	"Pyaasi-Pyaasi"	with Gulzar, Shreya Ghoshal	AR Productions
2016	"Saat-Din"	with Gulzar, Alka Yagnik	AR Productions
2016	"Asharfee"	with Gulzar, Kavita Krishnamurthy, Udit Narayan	AR Productions
2016	"Yeh Dil"	with Gulzar, Hariharan	AR Productions
2016	"Kaare-Megha"	with Gulzar, Abhijeet Bhattacharya	AR Productions
2016	"Doob Gaye"	with Gulzar, Hariharan	AR Productions
2016	"Sooraj-Sitarey"	with Gulzar	AR Productions
2016	"Ajnabee Zameen"	fusion-pop	AR Productions
2016	"Paathar"	with Bhoomi Trivedi	AR Productions
2015	Sounds of Nature	world music	Music Today
2013	Raat, Chand Aur Main	with Gulzar	Times Music
2007	Ritu Magic of the Six Indian Seasons	Solo	Music Today
2006	Amazing India: Symphonies of the Taj	Solo	Music Today
2006	Kab Aate Ho	with Gulzar	Times Music
2005	Amazing India: Khajuraho	Solo	Music Today
2004	Amazing India: Jaisalmer	Solo	Music Today
2002	Udaas Paani	with Gulzar	Times Music
2000	Raga Rendezvous	Solo	T-Series

== Film background scores ==
Year	Films
2017	Wedding Anniversary
2011	Shagird
2009	Tera Kya Hoga Johnny
2006	Ahista Ahista
2003	Haasil

== Playback ==
=== Abhishek Ray as playback singer ===
Year	Film/Album	Song	Label
2022	"Bengal 1947 An untold love story "	"Milan Hoga Kab Jaane"	with Pratibha Singh Baghel
2022	"Life's Good (film)"	"Bairi Badra"	Solo
2017	"Wedding Anniversary"	"The Rainbow Song"	with Bhoomi Trivedi
2017	"Wedding Anniversary"	"Ittefaqan- Valentine Waltz "	with Amika Shail
2015	Welcome Back	"Welcome Back Theme Song"	solo
2013	Raat Chand aur Main	All Songs	with Gulzar
2012	Paan Singh Tomar	"Dhai Dhai"	with Kailash Kher
2012	Paan Singh Tomar	"Jaao Dhal Jaao"	with Kailash Kher
2012	Prem Mayee	"Palchin"	with Shreya Ghoshal
2011	Yeh Saali Zindagi	"Yeh Saali Zindagi"	with Chitrangada Singh
2010	I Am Kalam	"Chini Bhini"	with Shreya Ghoshal
2010	I Am Kalam	"Chand Taare"	with KK (singer)
2008	Thoondil	"Kadhal Kadavulai Pole"	with Sunidhi Chauhan
2008	Thoondil	"Time is Now"	with Harshdeep Kaur, Pop Shalini
2008	Thoondil	"Ratham Sindhaatha"	with Sunidhi Chauhan
2008	Thoondil	"Athuva Ithu Edhu"	with Pop Shalini
2007	Ritu	All Songs	with Shanti Sharma
2006	Amazing India – Symphonies of the Taj	All Songs	with Radhika Chopra, Sangeeta Pant
2005	Amazing India – Jaisalmer	All Songs	with Rehmat Khan Langa
2005	Amazing India – Khajuraho	All Songs	with Radhika Chopra, Sangeeta Pant
2002	UDAAS PAANI	All Songs	with Gulzar
2000	RAGA RENDEZVOUS	All Songs	Solo

== Music for documentaries ==
Year	Documentary	Channel
2012	Shamans of the Himalaayas	Discovery Channel
2012	The Apatanis of Arunachal	Discovery Channel
2012	The Konyak of Nagaland	Discovery Channel
2011	Carnival of Spirituality	Discovery Channel
2010	Masters of the Jungle	Discovery Channel
2009	In Their Elements	National Geographic Channel
2009	Forced to Kill	Discovery Channel
2008	Chinese Checkers, Tibetan Ambivalence & Indian Delusions	Aim TV
2004	The Maharaja of Jodhpur: The Legacy Lives On	Discovery Channel
2000	The Maharaja of Jodhpur: The Legacy Lives On	Aim TV
1999	Shahjahanabad: The Twilight Years	Teamwork Films
