= Shivangi =

Shivangi is a female given name and a surname. Notable people with the name include:

== Given name ==
- Shivangi Bhayana (born 1996), Indian playback singer and actress
- Shivangi Joshi (born 1998), Indian television actress and model
- Shivangi Krishnakumar (born 2000), Indian playback singer, actress and television personality
- Shivangi Pathak (born 2002), Indian mountaineer
- Shivangi Singh (born 1995), Indian Navy officer

== Surname ==
- Sampat Shivangi (1936 or 1937–2025), Indian-born American physician
