= Waves (festival) =

Indian annual cultural festival

Waves Festival
- Genre: Cultural
- Dates: October/ November
- Venue: Birla Institute of Technology and Science, Pilani – K K Birla Goa Campus
- Location: Goa, India
- Inaugurated: 2006
- Organiser: BITS Pilani K K Birla Goa Campus
- Website: https://www.bitswaves.org/

Waves is an annual cultural festival held at BITS, K. K. Birla Goa Campus, India. The festival focuses on music, dance, and art, and typically takes place over three days in late October or early November. Established in 2006, the festival includes events related to dance, drama, literature, comedy, fashion, and music.

== History ==
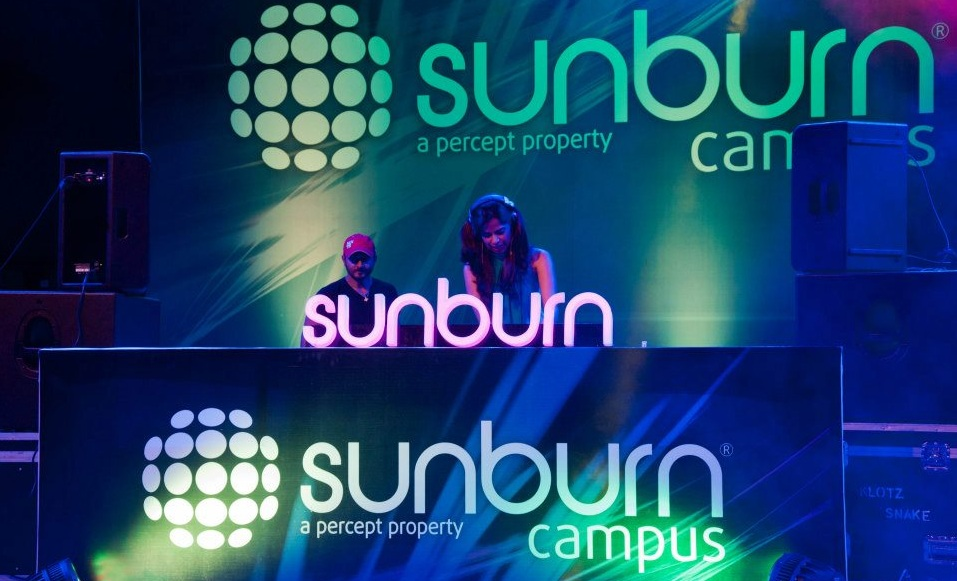
Pre-Sunburn Event at Waves'12

Waves originated as an intra-college festival in 2005 and became an intercollegiate event in 2006. In subsequent years, colleges from Goa and Mumbai participated. The theme for the 2008 festival was "Nirvana". In 2009, two editions of the festival were held. Waves 2014 included an international act, The Worldfest a Coke Studio performance for the Indie Nite, and the Sea Rock event, a semi-professional rock band competition.

Comedy groups such as All India Bakchod, TVF, and Being Indian have performed at Waves. The festival has also hosted events such as Sunburn and Femina Miss India eliminations.

The 10th anniversary of Waves was celebrated from November 4th to 6th in 2016, with the theme "Tides of Time". The theme for Waves 2019 was "En Voyage".

== Events ==
=== Competitions ===
Events and competitions at Waves span various cultural categories, including music, dance, literary arts, quiz, drama, fine arts, film, and more. Participants compete in over 40 competitions.

The concept of mini-fests was introduced in the 2017 edition of Waves, grouping competitions into four categories:

Florence, focuses on performing arts, Beau Vista is centered on design, Carpe Dictum covers literary arts, and Specials includes quiz, film, and photography events.

Waves also conducts elimination rounds for some competitions in cities outside the campus. For Waves 2016, the stand-up comedy competition "Show Me the Funny" held elimination rounds in cities including Mumbai, Pune, Bangalore, Delhi, and Hyderabad.

=== Big 4 ===
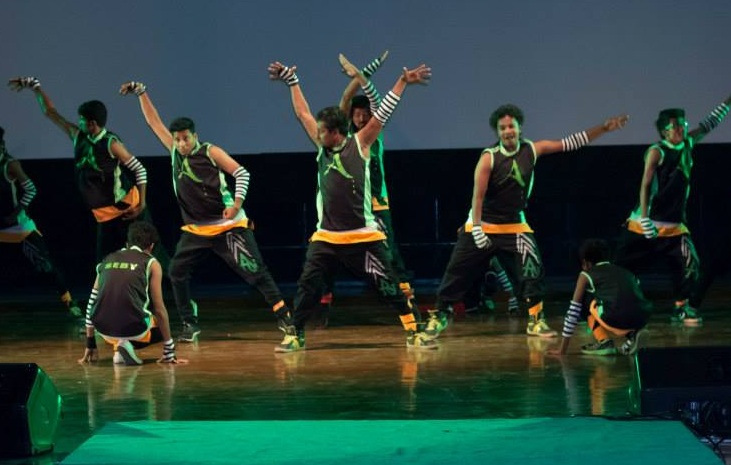
Natyanjali – Waves'14

Teams from colleges across India participate in these events.

==== Natyanjali ====
Natyanjali is a group dance competition featuring various dance forms. Judges have included individuals from dance and choreography academies in India.

==== Mr. And Ms. Waves ====
This event serves as a talent hunt. Participants showcase talents such as music, dance, and acting, followed by a question round.

In Waves 2019, this event was judged by Raghu Ram.

==== FACP ====
Fashion Parade (FACP) is the festival's fashion event, featuring themed ramp walks. The event has been judged by fashion training academies such as Femina in previous editions.

This event was judged by Meghna Kaur in the 2019 edition of Waves.

==== Sea rock ====
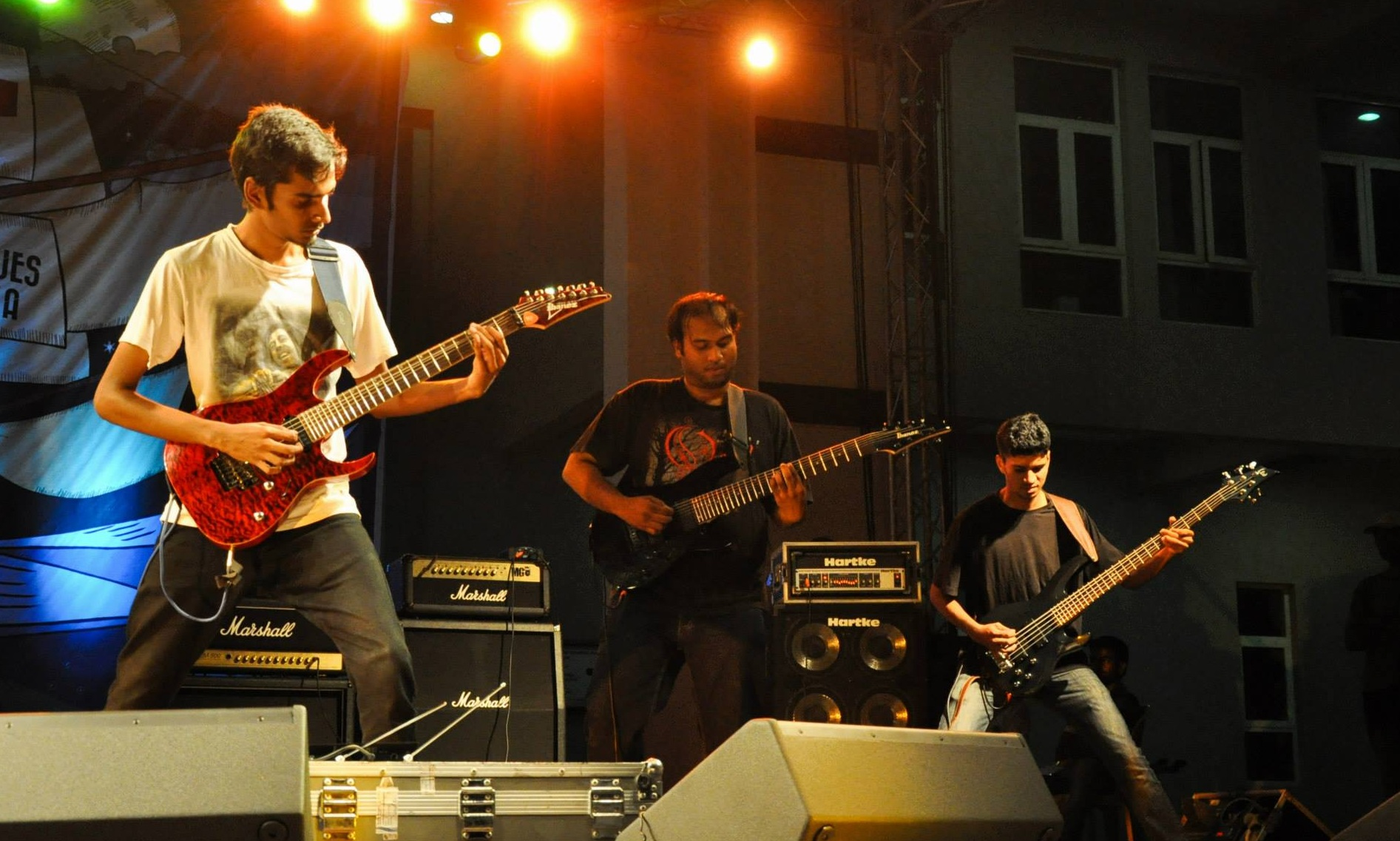
Sea rock – Waves'13

Sea Rock is a national semi-professional band competition with eliminations held in several cities, including Mumbai, Delhi, Chennai, Bangalore, and Goa. In 2018, Sea Rock included eliminations in Kathmandu elims, Nepal. Winners receive cash prizes, scholarships at music academies, and features in media publications. The top three bands also perform before the headlining artists on the Waves main stage.

=== Lex Omnia Moot Court ===
Lex Omnia, a Moot Court Event, is also featured at Waves. Participants from law schools across India take part. In 2015, Waves organised this event in association with NALSAR, Hyderabad.

=== Specials ===
The Specials at Waves include a variety of unconventional events and competitions. Previous editions have featured paintball, blackjack, poker, a donut eating competition, a Limca Book of Records attempt, a Guinness World Record attempt, Housie, All Night Treasure Hunt, Last Entrepreneur Standing, Wallstreet Fete, and Ratatouille.

== Creative works ==
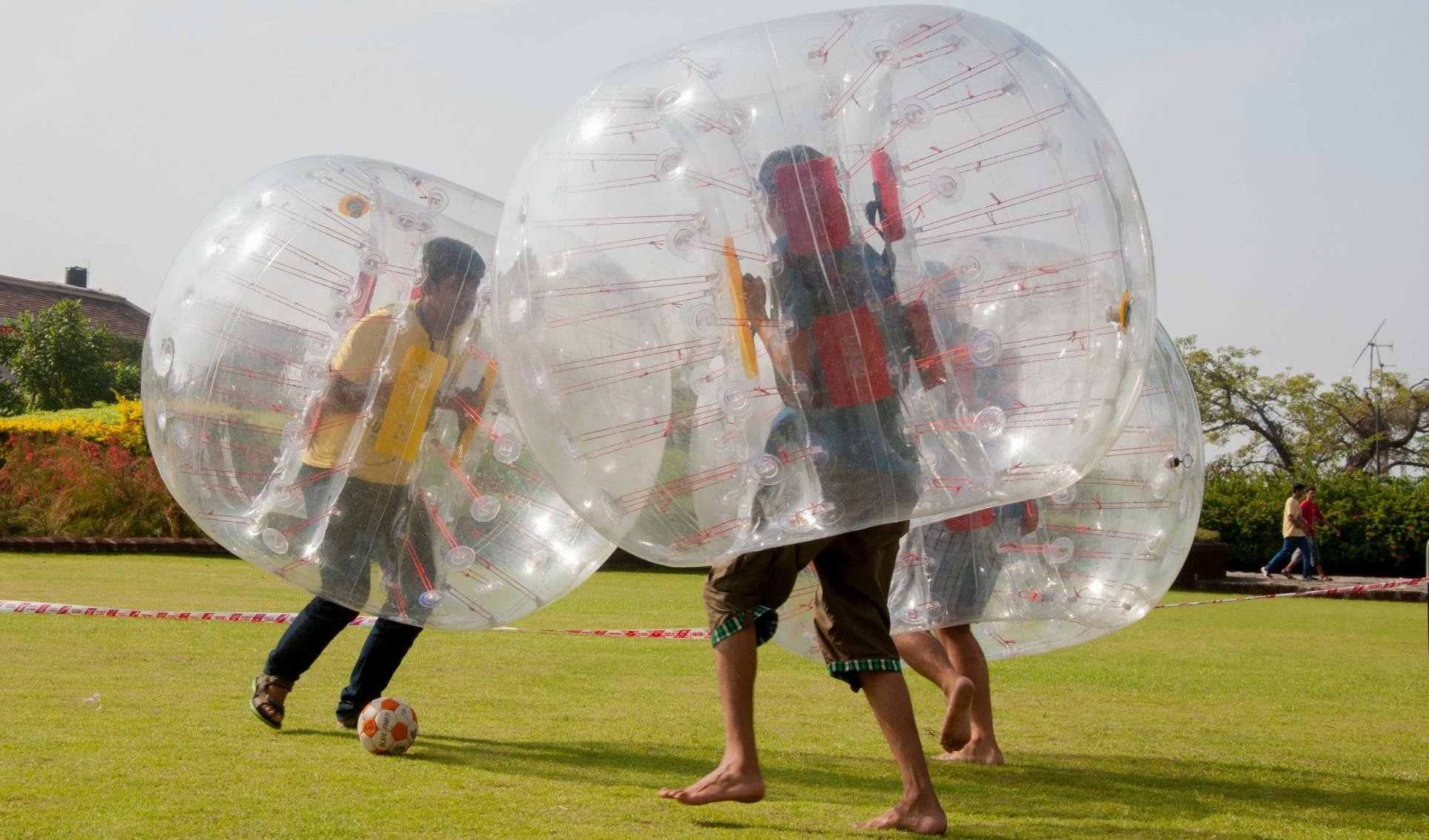
Zorb Soccer – Waves'14

Waves Ball

BITS Goa hosts The Waves Ball, inviting couples from participant colleges. The Ball includes diverse cuisine, a live band, and couple events and games.

The Waves Ball at Waves 2015 had a theme of "A Midnight in Paris".

Workshops

Waves hosts various workshops, including Belly Dancing, Origami, Skate-Boarding, Beat-boxing, Canvas Shoe Painting, Latin Dance, and Pottery. In addition to on-fest workshops, Waves organises a pre-fest Dance Workshop a month before the festival.

Adventure zone

Waves organises adventure events during the three days. Previous editions of Waves have included Zorb Soccer, Laser Tag, Paintball, Bungee Run, Slip Soccer, and Sumo Wrestling.

== Professional Nites ==
National and international artists perform annually at Professional Nights, or Pro-Nites. Waves has previously featured artists such as Vishal–Shekhar, Priyanka Chopra, Karsh Kale, Blackstratblues, Kailash Kher, Shafqat Amanat Ali, Shankar Mahadevan, Strings, Indian Ocean, Parikrama (band), Thermal and a Quarter, Pakistani rock band Raeth (band), Carnatic rock band Agam (band), Dead Letter Circus, Candice Redding, DJ NYK, and DJ Suketu.

The Pro-Nites of Waves are divided into three nights:

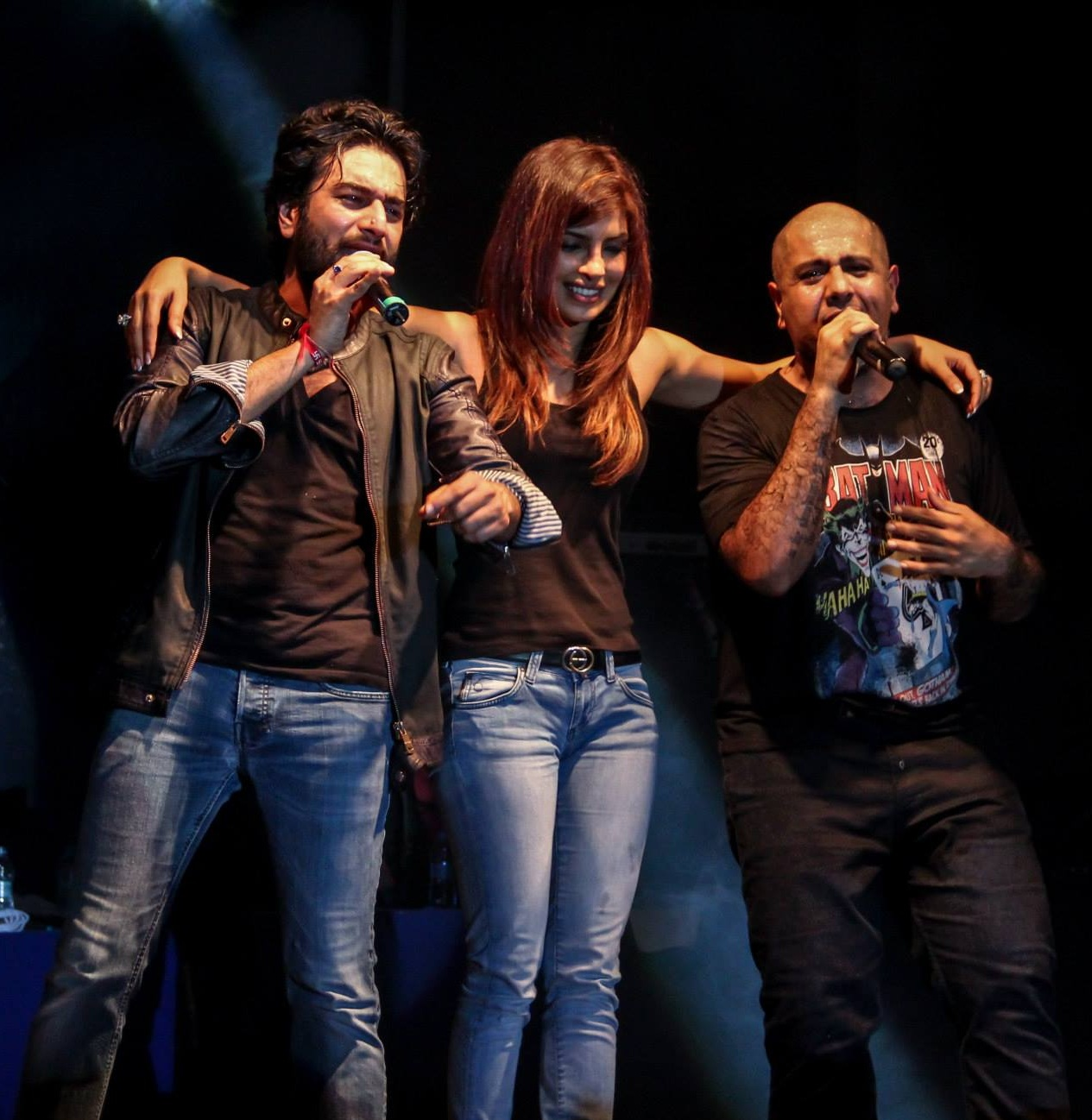
Priyanka Chopra, Vishal–Shekhar at Waves'13

EDM Nite

The EDM Nite is typically held on the final night, featuring an electronic musician. Previous editions have included performances by electronic music artists such as Tony Junior, Nucleya, Quintino, Marnik, Diego Miranda, and Ritviz. This is a musical performance.

EDM Nite has also hosted an official Pre-Sunburn event in previous editions.

There are usually two to three acts on EDM night, with opening acts performing before the main artist.

Indie Nite

Indie Nite features performances by Indie music artists. Past performers have included The Local Train, Dead Letter Circus, Blackstratblues, Anand Bhaskar Collective, The Yellow Diary, Indian Ocean and Sifar.

Bollywood Nite

Bollywood Nite features performances by artists such as Amit Trivedi, Jonita Gandhi Vishal–Shekhar, Kailash Kher, Salim–Sulaiman and Farhan Akhtar.

== Waves 2017 ==
Tagline: A Tale In Two Shades!

Waves 2017 introduced a new concept. Events included photography events such as "Montage", "Mezzo-tint", "Time Lapse", and "Reverse flash", "Waves Open Quiz", "Waves Debate Championship", "Rubik’s Cube Challenge", and "Wallstreet Fete". Events like Sea Rock and Show Me The Funny also continued. For the Bollywood night, Vishal–Shekhar performed.

== Waves 2018 ==
Tagline: Embrace The Shadows!

Waves 2018 featured events organised by the Music, Dance, Literary, Quiz, Drama, Moot Court, and Fine Arts clubs. This edition reportedly attracted a footfall of over 50,000, with students from over 150 colleges participating. It included a YouTube Conclave featuring individuals like Meghna Kaur and the YouTube channel Filter Copy. The Pro Nites of Waves 2018 included performances from Farhan Akhtar on Bollywood Night and Quintino on EDM night. The Indie Night featured a performance by the band Anand Bhaskar Collective.

== Waves 2019 ==
Tagline: En Voyage!

The festival was scheduled for 1–3 November. National eliminations for events such as Sea Rock, Irshaad, Inverse, and SMTF (Show Me The Funny) took place in various cities across the country beforehand.

== Sponsors and associations ==
Waves has attracted sponsorship from various organisations including Coke Studio, LinkedIn, Cadbury, Britannia, TATA, ICICI Bank, Idea, Crompton Greaves, Reliance, Bharat Petroleum, Hero, Classmate, Red Bull, Dell, LG, Reebok, AIRCEL, State Bank of India, Union Bank, T.I.M.E, Parle, Maruti Suzuki, and ToneTag.

Waves has associations with various academic and cultural institutions across the country for its events, including Indian Idol Academy, True School of Music (TSM), National Centre for Performing Arts (NCPA), Indian Mime Academy, Jogesh Mime Academy, Thespo, NALSAR Bangalore, Indian Institute of Photography, Terrence Lewis Academy, Saroj Khan Dance Academy, Shiamak Dawar International Dance Academy, Indian B-Boying Federation, Indian Institute of Art and Design, Style Fiesta, Chalta Hai Comedy, and Old Delhi Films.
