= Chris Cheong =

Malaysian magician, mentalist & illusionist

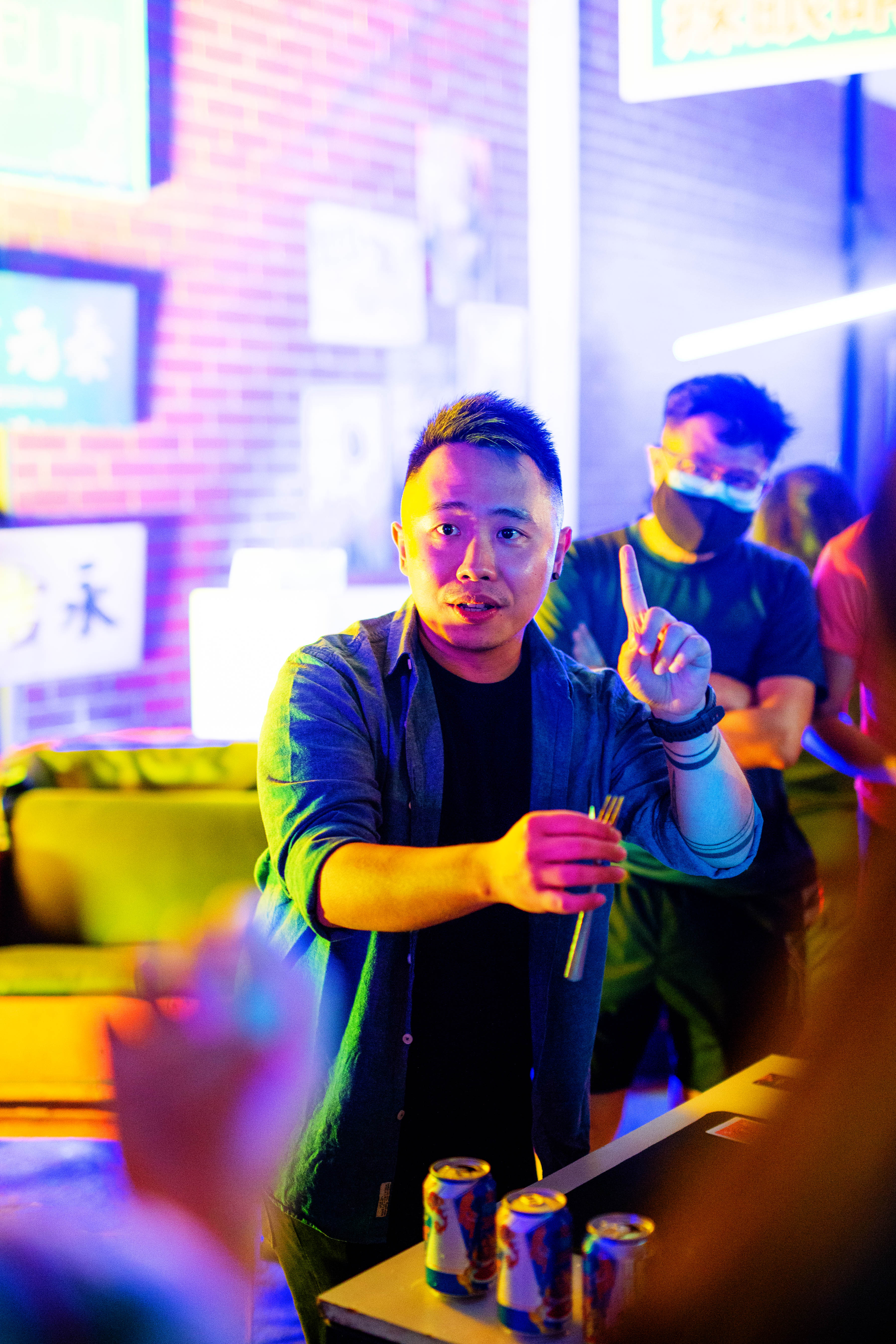
- Born: 18 November 1992 (age 33); Kuala Lumpur, Malaysia
- Known for: Magic Mentalism

Chris Cheong

Chinese name
- Traditional Chinese: 張杰棋
- Jyutping: Zoeng1 Git6 Kei4
- Hokkien POJ: Tiuⁿ Kia̍t-kî
- Tâi-lô: Tiunn Kia̍t-kî

Christopher Cheong Kit Kei (courtesy name 閻王 Yan Wang born 18 November 1992 in Penang), better known by the stage name Chris Cheong is an international mentalist and illusionist. He was previously credited to be one of Malaysia's youngest professional mentalist and magician later public voted as one of Malaysia's top ten magicians.

Cheong has made multiple appearances internationally, performing in Thailand, Indonesia, Singapore and Brunei. His first public appearance in the television scene at Radio Televisyen Malaysia as guest and later signed as their TV host on the series Kids on 2 and Lava Kids.

He is listed as one of the Successful People in Malaysia by the British Publishing House in their 3rd edition of the book Successful People in Malaysia, which is published and distributed to all state and national libraries in Malaysia. This biographical encyclopedia highlights Malaysians who have made significant contributions to nation-building and society as a whole.

== Early life ==
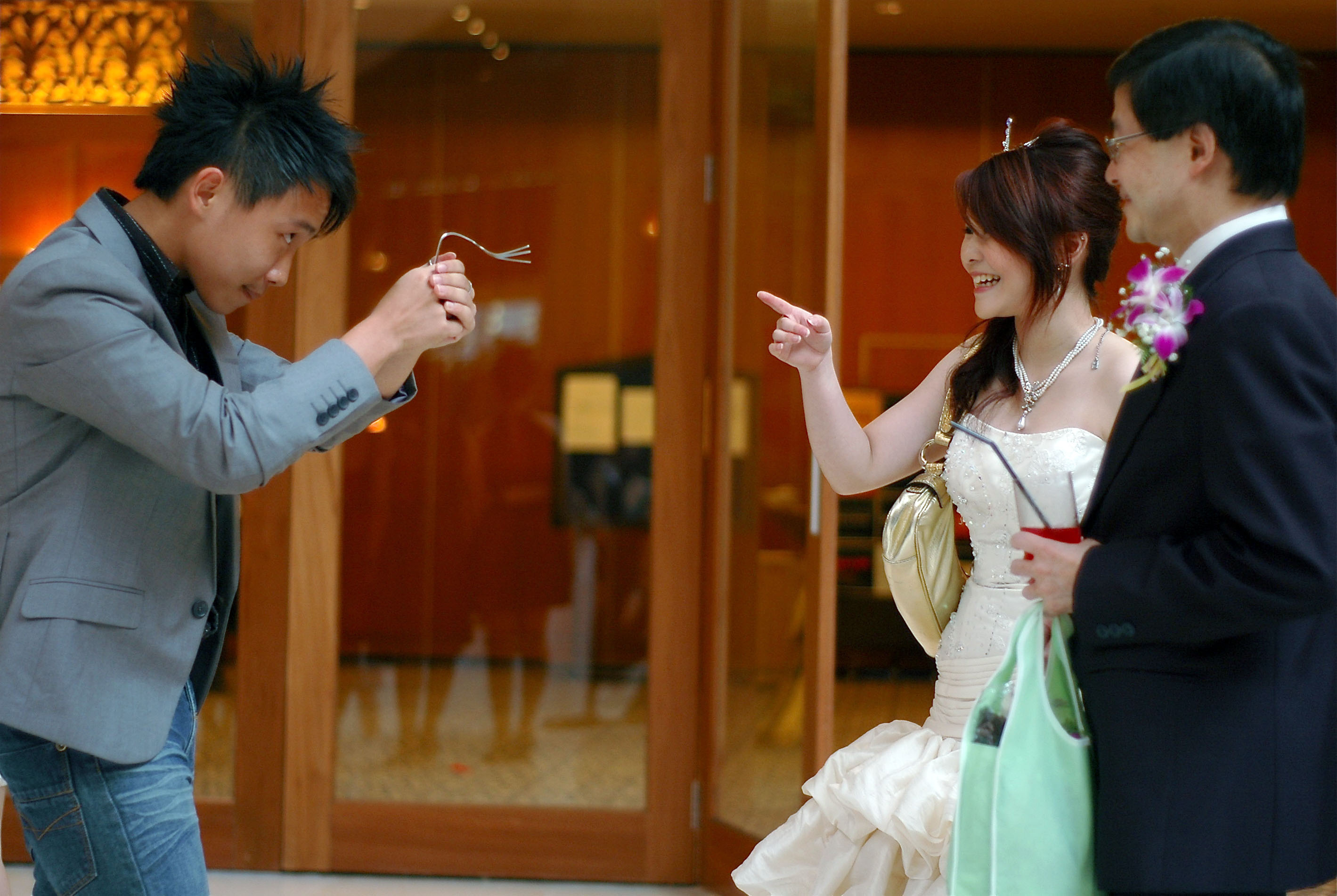
Cheong performing at the age of 16

Raised in Kuala Lumpur, the capital of Malaysia, Cheong first became interested in magic at the age of 8 when he was attracted by his birthday present, magic set from Toys "R" Us. From then, he began working on his magic skills, and at the age of 13, he started performing in events.

== Career ==
=== Performing ===
At age 15, Cheong made his first public appearance in Radio Televisyen Malaysia. A year later, he is signed as their magic segment TV host for TV series Kids on 2 and Lava Kids.

Cheong also appeared on other local media channel such as Bella, a Ntv7 programme and being interviewed by Deborah Priya Henry, Miss Universe Malaysia 2011.

In December 2012, Cheong made his first international artist collaboration with Sungha Jung, a South Korean acoustic finger-style guitarist who has risen to fame on YouTube.

In January 2014, in conjunction of Spring Fest, the annual social & cultural festival of Indian Institute of Technology, Kharagpur held during the month of January in the spring semester, Cheong was invited as one of the international guest artist to perform.

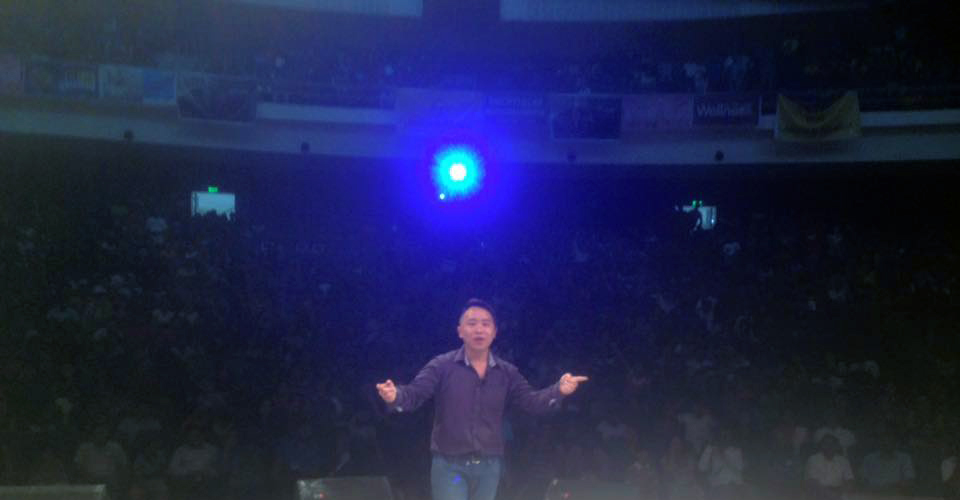
Cheong performing in India

In September 2015, Chris was invited as a guest performer representing Malaysia for Techniche, the annual Techno-Management festival of Indian Institute of Technology Guwahati, India.

In February 2016, Chris was invited to be the opening act of Quark, BITS Pilani Goa, one of the biggest festivals of its kind in India.

In March 2017, Chris Cheong performed at Pragyan, The largest student run (ISO Certified) Techno-Management fest of NIT Trichy.

In May 2017, Chris Cheong performed on board MV Glory Sea (Previously known as MV Celestyal Odyssey.

In 2017, Chris Cheong produces 8 live shows everyday in NagaWorld by NagaCorp Ltd.

=== Endorsement ===
In year 2012, Cheong became the brand ambassador of Fullhouse Lifestyle Store and Cafe.

=== Production ===
In Year 2013, Cheong launches a collaboration production with local sponsors for an online street magic series, title Mind & Magic.

=== Other work ===
Apart from his performing career, Cheong owns a side business which uses the art of magic and education as single package, better known as Magic-A-Learning Course. Later renamed to The Academy of Magic Malaysia.
