= Yeh Saali Zindagi =

- Theatrical release poster
- Directed by: Sudhir Mishra
- Produced by: Prakash Jha
- Starring: Irrfan Khan; Arunoday Singh; Chitrangada Singh; Aditi Rao Hydari
- Cinematography: Sachin K. Krishn
- Music by: Nishat Khan; Abhishek Ray
- Distributed by: Cine Raas Entertainment Pvt. Ltd.
- Release date: 4 February 2011
- Running time: 134 Minutes
- Country: India
- Language: Hindi
- Budget: ₹ 80 million
- Box office: ₹ 107.5 million

Yeh Saali Zindagi (transl. This damn life) is a 2011 Hindi crime thriller film directed by Sudhir Mishra. The film stars Irrfan Khan, Chitrangada Singh, Arunoday Singh and Aditi Rao Hydari in the lead roles. The film was released on 4 February 2011.

== Plot ==
Arun is a chartered accountant who works for Mr. Mehta and helps him run his illegal business. Arun is in love with Priti, but she falls for Shyam, who was introduced to her by Arun.

After Badey, a gangster of Delhi, falls out of favour of Minister Verma, he is sent to jail and humiliated and beaten daily on orders of the Minister. Satbir is a dishonest police officer who works for Badey and helps him in the jail. Kuldeep, who is also in jail with Badey, is released and goes to his wife Shanti. Badey's brother, Chhotey, and his gang of members, Kuldeep, Tony, Chacha, Guddu, and others, plan Badey's release by kidnapping Verma's to be son-in-law, Shyam, and daughter, Anjali. Things do not go as planned, and they end up kidnapping Shyam and his girlfriend Priti. To ensure Shyam's safety, Priti agrees to liaise between Verma and the gangsters, not knowing that Arun had been following them since the abduction. She meets Anjali, Verma, and Shyam's father, Singhania. However, Mr. Verma, who discovers Shyam's affair with Priti, refuses to negotiate Badey's release. Arun, in the meantime, transfers illegal and hawala money into the bank accounts of Verma's son and threatens him with leaking this information to the media if he does not ensure Badey's release. However, it comes to light that Chhotey wants to get Badey out only to get details of his bank accounts and plans to kill him. Learning of this, Badey gives the details of his foreign bank accounts to Kuldeep.

Upon being rescued from the prison, Chhotey unexpectedly comes from Georgia and meets Badey. In the meantime, police reach the spot, and in the crossfire, Badey escapes from Chhotey and is helped by Kuldeep and his gang. However, he is shot in the back and later kills himself. With Badey dead and Chhotey looking for him, Kuldeep decides to leave the country and asks Shyam's father for a ransom of ₹ 15 crores. Priti, under the guise of calling Mr. Singhania, calls Arun. Arun reaches the spot and tells Priti that he transferred ₹ 170 million into her account, which should be used by her to free Shyam and herself and live a happy life. Priti now realizes that she actually loves Arun.

Priti brings the money to a port from where Kuldeep plans to escape. Chhotey also reaches there, but Satbir double crosses him, and Kuldeep kills Chhotey to avenge the murder of his father. However, one of the bullets hits a railing and ricochets and hits Arun. The gangsters leave the spot, and Priti confesses to Arun that she loves him.

== Cast ==
- Irrfan Khan as Arun Shukla
- Chitrangada Singh as Priti Shirodkar
- Vipul Gupta as Shyam Singhania
- Arunoday Singh as Kuldeep Sawhney
- Aditi Rao Hydari as Shanti Ghosh
- Saurabh Shukla as Mehta Anand
- Sushant Singh as Inspector Satbir Choudhary
- Vipin Sharma as Tanveer 'Tony' Ahmed
- Yashpal Sharma as Badey
- Prashant Narayanan as Chhotey
- Tarun Shukla as Guddu
- Madhvi Singh as Anjali Verma, Minister Verma's daughter
- Naseer Abdullah as Singhania, Shyam's father
- Kamal Chandra as Jija
- Aditya Bhattacharya
- Anil Sharma as Verma, Minister
- Masood Akhtar
- Manu Rishi Chaddha

== Reception ==
=== Critical reception ===
The film received positive acclaim from critics. Nikhat Kazmi from the Times of India gave it 4.5/5 saying "Dark, devious and different, Yeh Saali Zindagi is brain-and-brawn drama".

Sukanya Verma from Rediff.com rated it 3.5/5 calling it a "A twisted entertainer" and further stated that "Yeh Saali Zindagi rocks, it's wonderfully unrestrained and entertaining with its mouthful of zingers penned by Mishra and Manu Rishi".

Rajeev Masand from IBNLive gave it 3 out of 5 stating that "Yeh Saali Zindagi surprises you, it takes its time to unfold, but it's a delicious little treat if you muster the patience for it".

Kaveree Bamzai from India Today gave it 3 out of 5 and said "It's a delightful little trifle that is individual fun, and so well acted".

Blessy Chettiar from the DNA also gave it 3 out of 5 saying that "Yeh Saali Zindagi, is chaotic but enjoyable, just like its hatke title Mishra presents a thrilling and hatke account of two men and the lengths they go to for love".

Mayank Shekhar from Hindustan Times gave the film 3 out of 5.

=== Box office ===
Yeh Saali Zindagi opened well at the box office scoring ₹45.0 million net over its first weekend. It remained steady throughout its first week grossing ₹75 million net. The film saw a huge drop in its second week, due to the release of Patiala House and grossed just ₹3 crore net. It finished its lifetime collections at ₹107.5 million net. It was declared "below average" by Boxoffice-India.

== Soundtrack ==
The music has been composed by sitarist Nishat Khan and has lyrics penned by Swanand Kirkire. The Yeh Saali Zindagi song has been composed and sung by Abhishek Ray.

Yeh Saali Zindagi

Soundtrack album by Nishat Khan
- Genre: Film Soundtrack
- Length: 39:19
- Label: T-Series

Track listing
No.	Title	Artist	Length
1.	"Dil Dar Ba Dar"	Shilpa Rao & Javed Ali	5:54
2.	"Ishq Tere Jalwe"	Shilpa Rao & Javed Ali	5:37
3.	"Kaise Kahein Alvida"	Javed Ali	4:15
4.	"Sararara"	Sukhwinder Singh	5:21
5.	"Sararara"	Javed Ali	5:21
6.	"Yeh Saali Zindagi"	Sunidhi Chauhan, Kunal Ganjawala & Shilpa Rao	5:01
7.	"Yeh Saali Zindagi (Bonus Song)"	Abhishek Ray	3:28
8.	"Yeh Saali Zindagi (Female Version)"	Sunidhi Chauhan & Shilpa Rao	5:02
