= Thoondil =

- Theatrical release poster
- Directed by: K. S. Adhiyaman
- Written by: K. S. Adhiyaman
- Produced by: M. Rajkumar; S. S. R. Thillainathan; P. Kaandeepan
- Starring: Shaam; Sandhya; Ramya
- Cinematography: T. Kaviyarasu
- Edited by: V. M. Udhayashankar
- Music by: Abhishek Ray
- Distributed by: Pyramid Saimara
- Release date: 22 February 2008
- Running time: 135 minutes
- Country: India
- Language: Tamil

Thoondil (transl. Hook) is a 2008 Indian Tamil-language romantic thriller film written and directed by K. S. Adhiyaman. The film stars Shaam, Sandhya, and Ramya, while Vivek and Revathi play supporting roles. The music was composed by Abhishek Ray with editing by V. M. Udhayashankar and cinematography by T. Kaviyarasu. The film was released on 22 February 2008, and failed at the box office.

== Plot ==
Pooja alias Divya is an upcoming model in London who meets Sriram, an IT worker, and falls in love. They sleep together, but Sriram leaves her when Divya's boss tells him to stay out of her life if he wants to see her make it big. Divya feels betrayed when she finds out but does not know that her boss is the reason behind the split. Divya does achieve her dream and becomes a top model but is on a revenge romp to wreak havoc in Sriram's happily married life to Anjali. Anjali is a cheerful girl whose only sorrow in life is that she does not have a child, and when she finally has a baby after four years of marriage to Sriram, Divya comes into her life and takes the baby away, saying that it is her baby. What happens after that forms the climax.

== Cast ==
- R. Sham as Sriram
- Sandhya as Anjali
- Ramya as Pooja/Divya
- Vivek as Mac
- Revathi as Dr. Jayanthi
- R. K. as Mr Zoom
- T. Siva as Mac's assistant
- Iona as Diana

== Production ==
The film was shot extensively in London. Sandhya, despite being hardly 20 years old when signing the film, agreed to play an older woman who is a mother.

== Soundtrack ==
The soundtrack was composed by Abhishek Ray.

All lyrics are written by Na. Muthukumar.

Track listing
| No. | Title | Singer(s) | Length |
|---|---|---|---|
| 1. | "Adhuva Ithu" | Naveen, Pop Shalini |
| 2. | "Kadhal Kadavulai" | Abhishek Ray, Sunidhi Chauhan |
| 3. | "Ratham Sindatha" | Sunidhi Chauhan |
| 4. | "Time is Now" | Pop Shalini |
| 5. | "Uyir Vazhvadhe" | Shreya Ghoshal |

== Release ==
Thoondil was initially scheduled to release in October 2007, and then 8 February 2008, but ultimately released on 22 February the same month. Moser Baer released the film via home video in June 2009.

== Reception ==
A critic from The Hindu wrote, "Generally in a story of thrill and supsence, you would expect verve and vibrancy. But in 'Thoondil' things take their own sweet time to move – hence the momentum is missing". Pavithra Srinivasan from Rediff.com wrote, "All in all, a supposedly suspense-filled love story that is anything but". A critic from Sify wrote, "The basic problem with the film is that the story is clichéd, unimaginative and amateurish to say the least. The presentation is old fashioned and the dialogues are banal." Muthu of Kalki praised the acting, humour, music, screenplay, cinematography but panned the editing.
