= Pratibha Singh Baghel =

Indian film singer based in Bollywood

- Born: Rewa, Madhya Pradesh, India
- Occupation: Singer
- Years active: 2008–present

Pratibha Singh Baghel (born 4 January), also referred to as Pratibha Singh and Pratibha Baghel, is an Indian singer who sings Hindustani classical music, ghazals as well as Bollywood film songs.

== Early life ==
Pratibha Singh Baghel was born in Rewa. She completed music qualifications Sangeet Prabhakar and Sangeet Parveen. Influenced by an uncle, she trained for singing thumris.

== Career ==
Baghel made her debut on the music reality show Sa Re Ga Ma Pa Challenge 2009. She was a top finalist, topping the Shankar Mahadevan gharana, but got eliminated before the final. Nevertheless, her performance received critical acclaim, and she received opportunities for stage shows in Mumbai and eventually playback singing spots in Bollywood films.

She lent her voice to feature films including: Issaq, Bollywood Diaries, Shorgul, Humpty Sharma Ki Dulhania, Zid, Baazaar, Manikarnika: The Queen of Jhansi, Dono and Baba Ramsaa Peer. Her song "Jheeni Re Jheeni" along with classical vocalist Rashid Khan is considered one of her best.

In 2020, Baghel released a ghazal album along with violinist Deepak Pandit, called Bole Naina, which also featured the lyricist Gulzar and tabla player Zakir Hussain. Its online video is reported to have attracted 50 million views in two days. She teamed up with composer Abhishek Ray to release a series of singles: a sufi rock in Dhaagey, Indian folk song in Kanha ki Preet, a love ballad in Ilzaam, and a ghazal fusion song Kaise—The Music of Goodbye, all released on YouTube. In 2022, she shot a video song called Anjam-e-Mohabbat in Kolkata, composed by Ananjan Chakraborty. She also released an independent ghazal single called Kya Kije under the Bazm-e-Khas label, composed by Ghansham Vaswani. In the same year, she was also featured in Sanjay Leela Bhansali's album Sukoon.
