= Birla Institute of Technology and Science, Pilani – Goa Campus =

Indian Private Engineering Institute

Coordinates: 15°23′27″N 73°52′39″E

Birla Institute of Technology and Science, Pilani (K. K. Birla Goa Campus)
- Motto: ज्ञानं परम् बलं Gyanam paramam balam
- Motto in English: Knowledge is the Supreme Power
- Type: Private
- Established: 2004; 22 years ago
- Affiliations: UGC
- Chancellor: Kumar Mangalam Birla
- Vice-Chancellor: V. Ramgopal Rao
- Director: Suman Kundu
- Location: Sancoale, Goa, India
- Campus: Semi-urban, 188 acres (0.76 km^{2})
- Website: www.bits-pilani.ac.in/Goa/

Birla Institute of Technology and Science, Pilani – Goa Campus is one of the five constituent campuses of the BITS Pilani located in Goa, India. It was established in the year 2004.

In April 2011, following the August 2008 death of the Chancellor, Krishna Kumar Birla, the campus was renamed as Birla Institute of Technology and Science, Pilani K. K. Birla Goa Campus in his memory. In August 2011, the campus held its first ever convocation ceremony, during which 580 graduates were awarded their degrees.

== Campus ==
The BITS Pilani Goa Campus was designed by the RSP Design Group. The campus is located in Zuari nagar, Goa, on the banks of the Zuari River and houses more than 4,000 students. The hostels are spread across three regions: 'A', 'C' and a newly constructed 'D', which encompass nine, seven and six hostels respectively. In 2023, a Married PhD Research scholars quarters was opened to the scholars. Known for its scenic beauty, HolidayIQ.com, a popular holiday recommendation website, has listed the Goa campus of BITS Pilani 7th in its list of beautiful campuses. The BITS Goa Campus has a BCCI-recognized cricket ground maintained by the Goa Cricket Association that has hosted several national level tournaments such as the Vijay Hazare Trophy and a football ground maintained by Salgaocar F.C. In addition to this, there exists a Students Activity Centre (SAC) where facilities like gymnasium, badminton court, table tennis, squash and other indoor games are available.

== Academics ==
The academic course structure is governed by the university, BITS Pilani. However, each campus has its own autonomous administration, student welfare division, faculty recruitment and placement division.

The institute offers four-year B.E. "first degree" programs and also 5-year M.Sc. (Honors) degrees through its dual-degree system. It also used to offer M.Sc. (Tech) Information Systems until recently before it was discontinued and merged with Computer Science. It also offers M.E. and Ph.D. programs in various fields.

BITS Pilani also offers a dual degree to the students of Master of Science programs. The dual degree is offered in one of the engineering programs after freshman year. The engineering degree being offered is based on the student's choice and their academic performance in the first year. Under the dual degree scheme, a student is offered two separate degrees on graduation: a degree in Master of Science (Honors.) and in Bachelor of Engineering (Honors). Students performing exceptionally well in the first year are also eligible to pursue two B. E. or two M.Sc. courses together.

The institute offers a vertical transfer system through which students performing exceptionally well in their first year are given an opportunity to have their branch changed. Through this, M.Sc. students can abandon their M.Sc. in favour of a B. E. single degree.

=== Admission ===
Since 2005, admission to BITS Pilani has been offered to students based on their performance in the all-India Entrance Examination, called BITS Admission Test (BITSAT) at the undergraduate level and through GATE and BITS HD exam at the graduate level. BITS Pilani also has the policy of accepting State and National Board toppers. There is no reservation of seats on the basis of caste or category. BITSAT is a computer-based test and is held at BITS authorized test centers.

== Student life ==
The course structure allows students a degree of freedom in choosing how they want to spend their time while in college. A lenient attendance policy and active student-run clubs and departments ensure the all-round development of the students and allows them to make connections that would help them later in their careers.

The students run the following festivals:

- Waves - International level cultural festival
- Quark - International level technical festival
- Spree - International level sports festival
- Zephyr - Internal inter-hostel festival

== Gallery ==
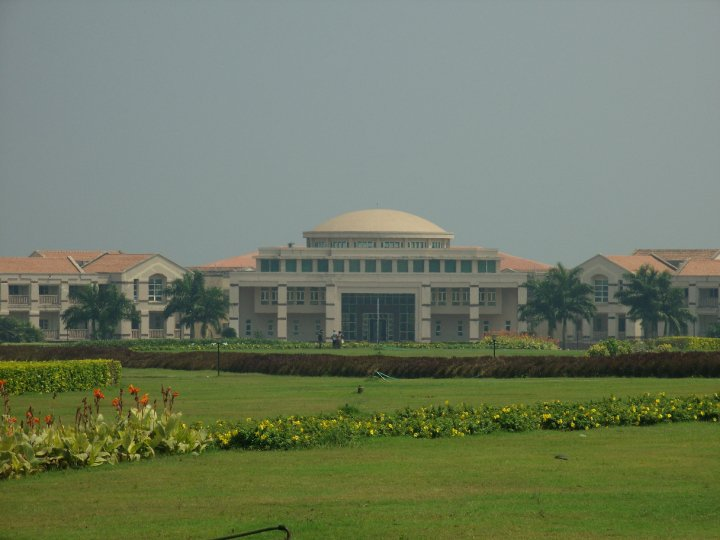
B-Dome from main lawns

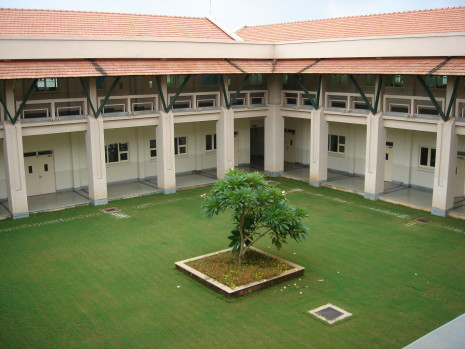
Inside the main building

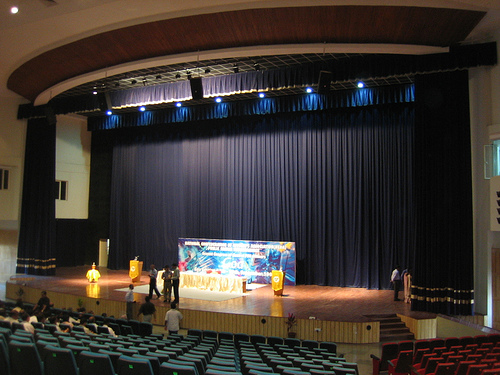
Auditorium

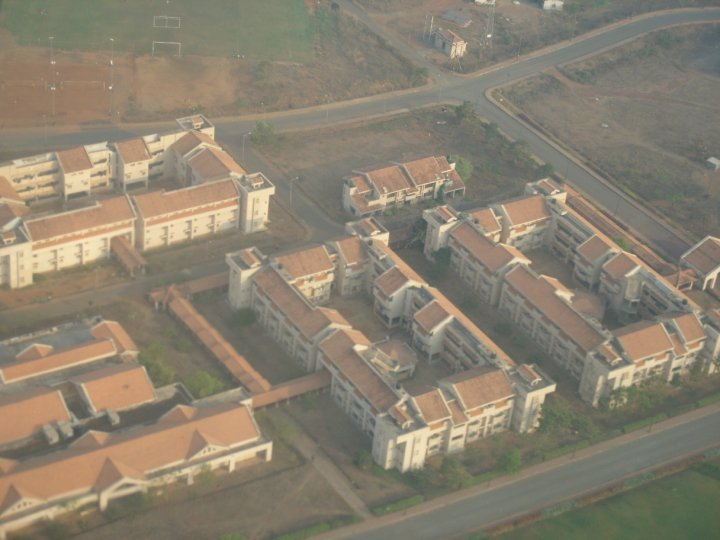
Hostel

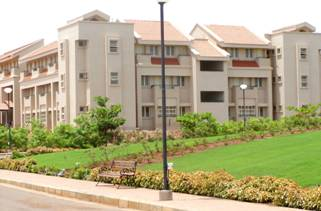
Hostel

== See also ==
- Birla Institute of Technology and Science, Pilani – Dubai Campus
- Birla Institute of Technology and Science, Pilani - Pilani Campus
- Birla Institute of Technology and Science, Pilani - Hyderabad Campus
