= Spring Fest =

Festival of the Indian Institute of Technology, Kharagpur

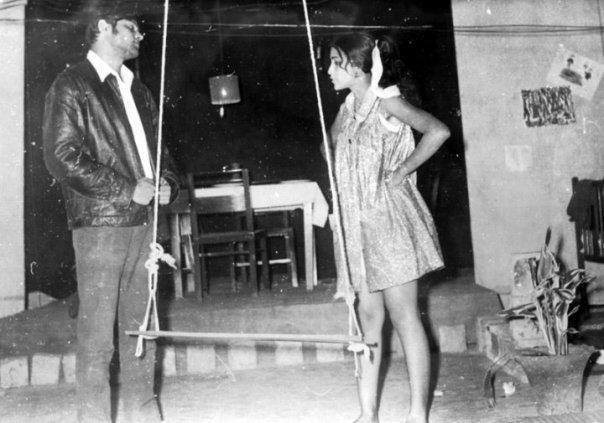
- A play at Spring Fest, c. 1970
- Genre: social and cultural festival
- Locations: Kharagpur, India
- Founded: 1960
- Guests: Salim–Sulaiman, KK, Shaan, Vishal–Shekhar, Sadhguru, Sunidhi Chauhan, Shankar Mahadevan, Hariprasad Chaurasia, Pandit Vishwa Mohan Bhatt
- Attendance: 80,000+
- Patron: Indian Institute of Technology Kharagpur
- Filing status: Student-run non-profit organization
- Prize money: 30 lakhs
- Website: www.springfest.in

Spring Fest, known as SF (motto: True Spirit of Youth), is the annual social and cultural festival of the Indian Institute of Technology, Kharagpur held during January in the spring semester. The first edition was held in 1960. The 66th edition of Spring Fest was organized from 24 to 27 January 2025.

== Inception and growth ==
The first edition of Spring Fest was held in 1960, which makes it one of the oldest college fests in India. It was conceived as a platform for the students of IIT Kharagpur to showcase their extra academic skills. Over the years, it began to attract participants from the neighboring colleges of West Bengal. In the last decade or so, the fest grew in scale, attracting participants from all over India and as well as abroad. The 2019 edition of the fest received a footfall of over 80,000 people.

The 2021 Spring Fest was held online drawing 100k live viewers.

== Activities ==
During the fest, students from IIT Kharagpur and from different colleges all over the country participate in a multitude of social and cultural activities. The ambit of the events encompasses various genres like Dance, Music, Dramatics, Photography, Literature, Quizzing, Food Fest and Fine Arts.

Spring Fest includes several events, including Nukkad, Shuffle, Wildfire, Rangmanch, Centrifuge and Lake Side Dreams. Preliminary rounds for Nukkad, Shuffle and Wildfire are held in cities across India.

Other non-competition based events include Hard-Talk, which involves talks/conferences by eminent personalities from a variety of fields, a talk by motivational speakers and various workshops on Filmography, mocktail making, cupcake dressing etc. The number of these events is particularly large and serves to cater to the very large number of participants — both local as well as from other colleges all over the country.

The hub for major activities during the fest is called the Arena, which has the Informals and Perpz stage. The informals stage hosts various fun filled casual activities, for which the participants can win numerous prizes. The Perpz stage is an all day dance floor with a DJ, that attracts huge crowds. Apart from this the arena also has numerous food and corporate stalls.

== Pro Nights ==
The evenings are notable for the "Pro-Nights", more commonly known as Star-Nites — the biggest events in Spring Fest which usually involve live concerts by some of the most famous musicians and bands of national and international acclaim. All the Star Nites are free to attend for any student of the institute and all registered participants. The genres of music are wide and varied and involve pop, rock and fusion bands. The venue for these events is the Tagore Open Air Theater (TOAT) and Jnan Ghosh Stadium which usually get packed to their full capacity during the Star-Nites, with crowds of up to 23,000 people. Famous Indian artists like Armaan Malik, Sachin–Jigar, Shalmali Kholgade, Farhan Akhtar, Amit Trivedi, Salim–Sulaiman, Pritam, Kailash Kher, KK, Papon, S. P. Balasubrahmanyam, Shaan, Sunidhi Chauhan, Vishal–Shekhar, Shweta Pandit, Shankar Mahadevan, Shivamani, Sukhwinder Singh and classical performers such as Pandit Debashish Bhattacharya, Pandit Hariprasad Chaurasia, L. Sriram, Pandit Vishwa Mohan Bhatt, and Pandit Divyang Vakil have performed here. Bands like The Local Train, Coshish, Order of Chaos, Pentagram, Swarathma, Underground Authority, Kryptos, Parikrama, Euphoria, Indian Ocean, Strings, and Spunk have also performed.

International bands like Dead By April Breathe, the Floyd Sound, Monuments, Led Zepplica, TesseracT and The Order of Chaos have also performed on the Spring Fest stage.

Spring Fest has also hosted many EDM artists from across the world namely Nina Suerte, The Progressive Brothers, Diego Miranda, Zaeden and Zephyrtone.

== Events ==
Spring Fest consists of more than 130 events from varied genres that provide a platform for students where they can prove their mettle and caliber.

The fest conducts its Hitch Hike - Nation Wide Prelims held in 8 cities for events like Wildfire, the national level rock band competition; SF Idol, Solo Singing competition; Shuffle, the street dance competition;Shake a Leg, Solo Dance Competition; Two for a Tango, Duo Dance competition; and Nukkad, the street play competition. Wildfire attracts registrations from multitudes of bands, and prizes in the 2019 edition were worth more than 5 lakh INR.

Spring Fest 2018 for the first time added preliminary round for the events Hilarity Ensues and Poetry Slam which was held in cities closer to Kharagpur namely Kolkata, Ranchi and Bhubhaneshwar. These rounds were termed as the Eliminations round.

Most of the socio-cultural activities are day events which involve dramatics, music, dance competitions, fine arts contests, quizzes, food fest, gaming and other literary events. Judges of the competitions are reputed and famous personalities from different fields and organisations. Centrifuge, the inter-collegiate dance event, is arguably the most keenly followed event of the fest. The other notable events are Rangmanch, the inter-collegiate dramatics event; Sargam, the eastern musical jamming competition; and Mary Bucknell Trophy, the prestigious quiz competition.

Notable additions of the previous editions have been Prom Night, Silent DJ, Poker Night, Fashion Show, Beat Boxing competition and many more.

== Notable guests ==
Every year many esteemed personalities of different fields from around the country are invited as guests and judges for different events and competitions. Some of the prominent guests to participate in the festival are Ashish Vidyarthi, Rakesh Bedi, Purbayan Chatterjee, Makrand Deshpande, Gilad Dobrecky, Dr. Kumar Vishwas, Lilette Dubey, Pt. Debashish Bhattacharya, Kailash Kher, Jim Ankan Deka, Rahat Indori, Nagesh Bhosle, Divya Jagdale, Ankur Deka, Freddie Bryant, Dr. Ashok Viswanathan, and Naseeruddin Shah.

== International Carnival ==
The International Carnival was conceived for the first time in Spring Fest 2014. It consisted of acts and performances from all around the globe. Among these were Chris Cheong, a magician and mentalist from Malaysia; Jack Glatzer, a violinist from Portugal; Murray Molloy, a sword swallower from Ireland; Almost Trio, a juggling duo from Hungary; and Jonathan Kay, an indo-jazz saxophonist from Canada. The second edition of the International Carnival in 2015 revamped the international performances, with street performances by Ronaldo Fanzini and Monsieur Gusto from Ireland, and an enchanting Indo-Canadian folk music performance by Autorickshaw Trio from Canada. In 2016, Spring Fest bore witness to a never before seen concept of unified music from around the Globe. With musical performances from all around the world, the Global Music Festival was a huge success. Performances by the post-rock band Paint the Sky Red from Singapore; the indie pop band Pleasantry from Singapore; the Irish folk music duo Fasta Duo; the Israeli rock band Ouzo Bazooka; and the seven piece contemporary folk music band Skipper's Alley from Ireland, all coupled with a sensational star night featuring Dead By April from Sweden, escalated the first Global Music festival to produce a sensational boom. Also, the third international carnival in 2016 continued the ongoing momentum with four exhilarating acts, which included Tommillusions, a magician from Singapore; Shazet, a beatboxer from Malaysia; Logy Logan (Logy On Fire), a street juggler from Ireland; and Murray Molloy from Ireland. Spring Fest 2019 again had a number of international guests to show off their skill and interact with the crowd. These include Scalia, basketballer from Malaysia; Extra Crunchy, Graffiti Artist Duo from Israel; Bruno Eddie, Portuguese Fire Artist; Sophie von Metern, Swedish Musician; Cis Bakelijia, Breakdancer from Belgium; Daniel, Spanish Beatboxer; Anders, a Danish guitarist; and The Order of Chaos, a Canadian metal band.

== Media and publicity ==
SF is notable for being one of the largest student events in the country and is often cited as an example of the management skills of IITians in general. The fest has attracted a large amount of coverage from the electronic and print-media. MTV India and The Telegraph, Kolkata, have covered the fest extensively in previous years. Numerous articles have appeared about Spring Fest in various newspapers all over India. Spring Fest 2020 had more than 150 articles printed in various newspapers across the country which included newspapers like The Times of India, Hindustan Times, and Dainik Jagran.

== Structure of the organization ==
The Spring Fest team is composed of the core team, the design team, the web team and the media cell. The core team consists of third years, called the core organizing team heads headed by the executive heads and second years who form the core organizing team members. The core team is responsible for getting sponsorship for the fest, handles publicity throughout India and organizes and executes the events. Pre-fest tasks, formulation of events, internal publicity, security, student accommodation, transportation, guest reception, and arena design. are distributed among the heads and members of the core organizing team. First year form the associate member team and are primarily responsible for the publicity aspect of the fest. The previous years' core team heads are called Steering Committee Members. They provide guidance to the core team over important issues. The design team and web team are responsible for designing the websites and various creatives used in publicity while the Media Cell is responsible for media and public relations aspect.
