= Prem Mayee =

- Film poster
- Directed by: Shekhar S Jha
- Written by: Shekhar S Jha
- Produced by: Chirag Bhesania
- Starring: Shreya Narayan
- Music by: Abhishek Ray
- Release date: 12 October 2012
- Running time: 125 minutes
- Country: India
- Language: Hindi

Prem Mayee is a 2012 Indian film starring Chandrachur Sing, Shreya Narayan and Auroshikha Dey.

== Premise ==
Payal is in love with Arun but soon after their marriage, their relationship becomes difficult .

== Cast ==
- Chandrachur Singh as Arun
- Shreya Narayan as Payal
- Chitrashi Rawat as Shrishti
- Sanjay Suri as Nirvaan
- Auroshikha Dey as Megha
- Murali Sharma
- Yatin Karyekar

== Soundtrack ==
The music of the film is given by Abhishek Ray and lyrics is given by Shekhar S Jha.

No.	Title	Singer(s)	Length
1.	"Bahne Dey"	Bhoomi Trivedi
2.	"Prem Mayee Rajani"	Shreya Ghoshal
3.	"Paheli"	Sunidhi Chauhan
4.	"Pal Chhin"	Shreya Ghoshal, Abhishek Ray
5.	"Veenavadini Symphony"	Shaan
6.	"Kanak Kiran"	Shaan

== Release ==
The film was released on 12 October 2012.

== Reception ==
A review in the Times of India stated, "Prem Mayee is about a girl who feels lost and depressed, unfortunately, that is exactly what you feel after watching this potentially meaningful but meaningless film!"
