= Sitabani Wildlife Reserve =

Wildlife reserve in Uttarakhand, India

- Sitabani
- Interactive map of Sitabani Wildlife Reserve
- Location: Nainital, Uttarakhand, India
- Nearest city: Ramnagar
- Coordinates: 29°46′N 79°26′E
- Website: www.sitabaniwildlifereserve.com https://sitabani.business.site

Sitabani Wildlife Reserve is a wildlife reserve in Amgarhi, located in the Nainital district of Uttarakhand, India. It is home to a variety of flora and fauna, including leopards, tigers, and over 500 species of native and migrating birds, that pass through the area throughout the year.

== History ==
The wildlife reserve is named after Sita, the wife of Hindu god Rama, due to the belief that Sita and her sons Luv and Kush had spent some of her exile in this forest.

Many local villagers were inducted and employed at the reserve by the founder Abhishek Ray, thereby generating revenue through Eco-tourism and creating a sustainable conservation area.

== Animals ==
Being a part of the Trans-Himalayan birding corridor, the reserve gets both plain and mountain birds during latitudinal and attitudinal migration patterns. Some Himalayan animal species, like Himalayan Black Bear, Himalayan weasel, Yellow-throat Pine Marten, Himalayan Goral, and Himalayan Serow also visit the reserve, especially during the colder months. Indian leopards in this reserve inhabit the craggy cliffs and gorges to avoid interaction with their dominant predator, the Royal-Bengal Tiger. This tiger species prefers the thick forested valleys and lowlands. Herds of Asiatic Elephants pass through the reserve when migrating between the core and buffer areas of Jim Corbett National Park. Altitudinal and geographical variations and diverse flora, combined with direct connectivity with Jim Corbett National Park on one side and the Nainital Forest Division on the other, makes this reserve a natural tiger, leopard, and birding corridor of strategic conservation value.
