= IIT Patna =

Research institute in Patna, India

Indian Institute of Technology Patna
- भारतीय प्रौद्योगिकी संस्थान पटना
- Motto: Vidyārthī labhate vidyām (Sanskrit)
- Motto in English: One who aspires wisdom, attains it
- Type: Public institute of technology
- Established: 2008 (18 years ago)
- Chairman: Thachat Viswanath Narendran
- Visitor: President of India
- Director: Amit Patra
- Faculty: 166 faculty members (January 2024)
- Students: 2,883 (2023-2024)
- Undergraduates: 1,797 (2023-2024)
- Postgraduates: 446 (2023-2024)
- Doctoral students: 640 (2023-2024)
- Location: Kanpa Road, Bihta, Patna, Bihar, India
- Campus: 501 acres (202.7 ha); Urban
- Colors: Saffron, White, Green & Blue
- Website: www.iitp.ac.in
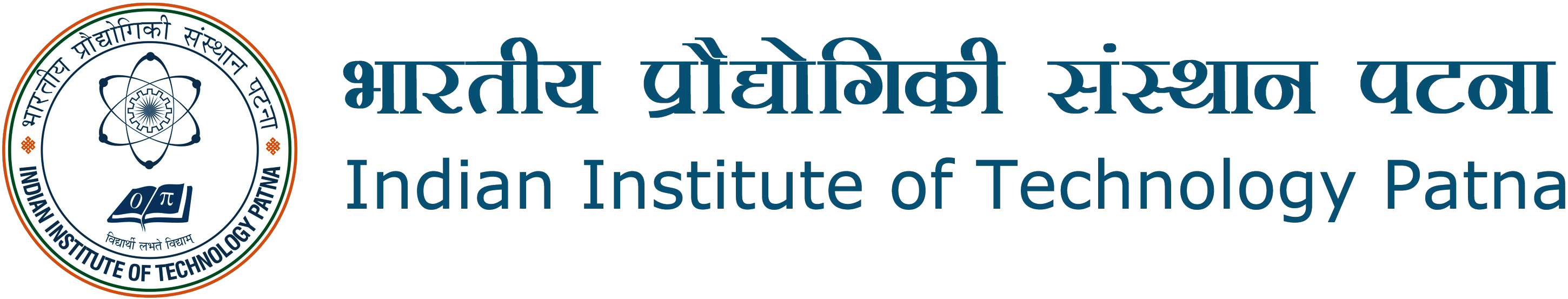

The Indian Institute of Technology Patna (IIT Patna or IITP) is a public research university and technical institute in Bihta, Patna, Bihar, India. It is recognized as an Institute of National Importance by the Government of India. It is one of the second generation IITs established by an Act of the Indian Parliament on 6 August, 2008. The campus of IIT Patna, located at Bihta, approximately 35km from Patna, has been fully operational since its inauguration by Hon'ble Prime Minister Shri Narendra Modi on 25 July, 2015.

== Campus ==
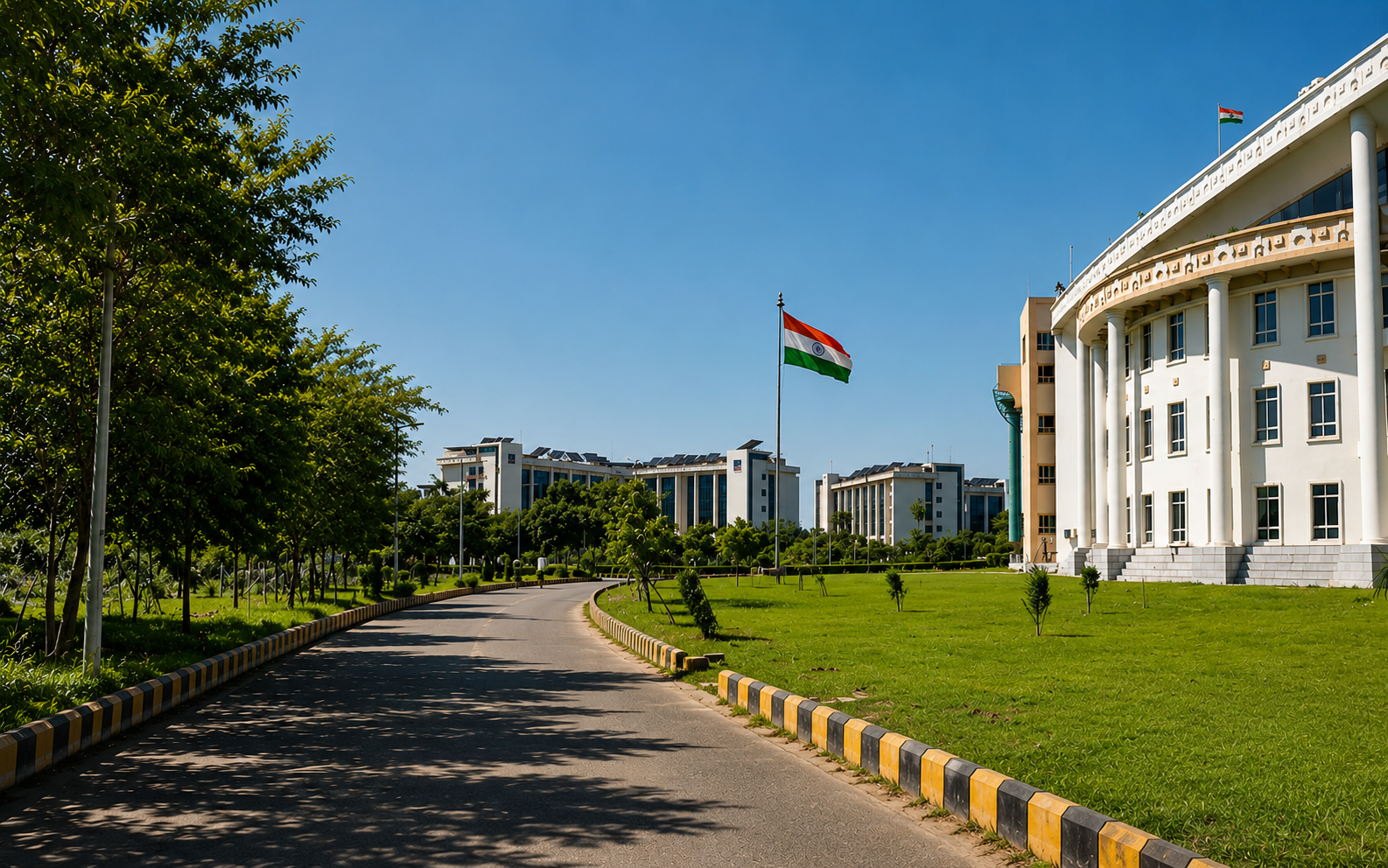
Rear view of Academic Complex

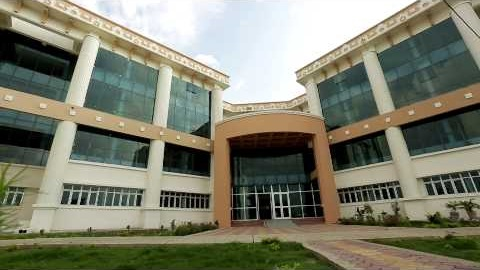
IIT Patna New Campus Building

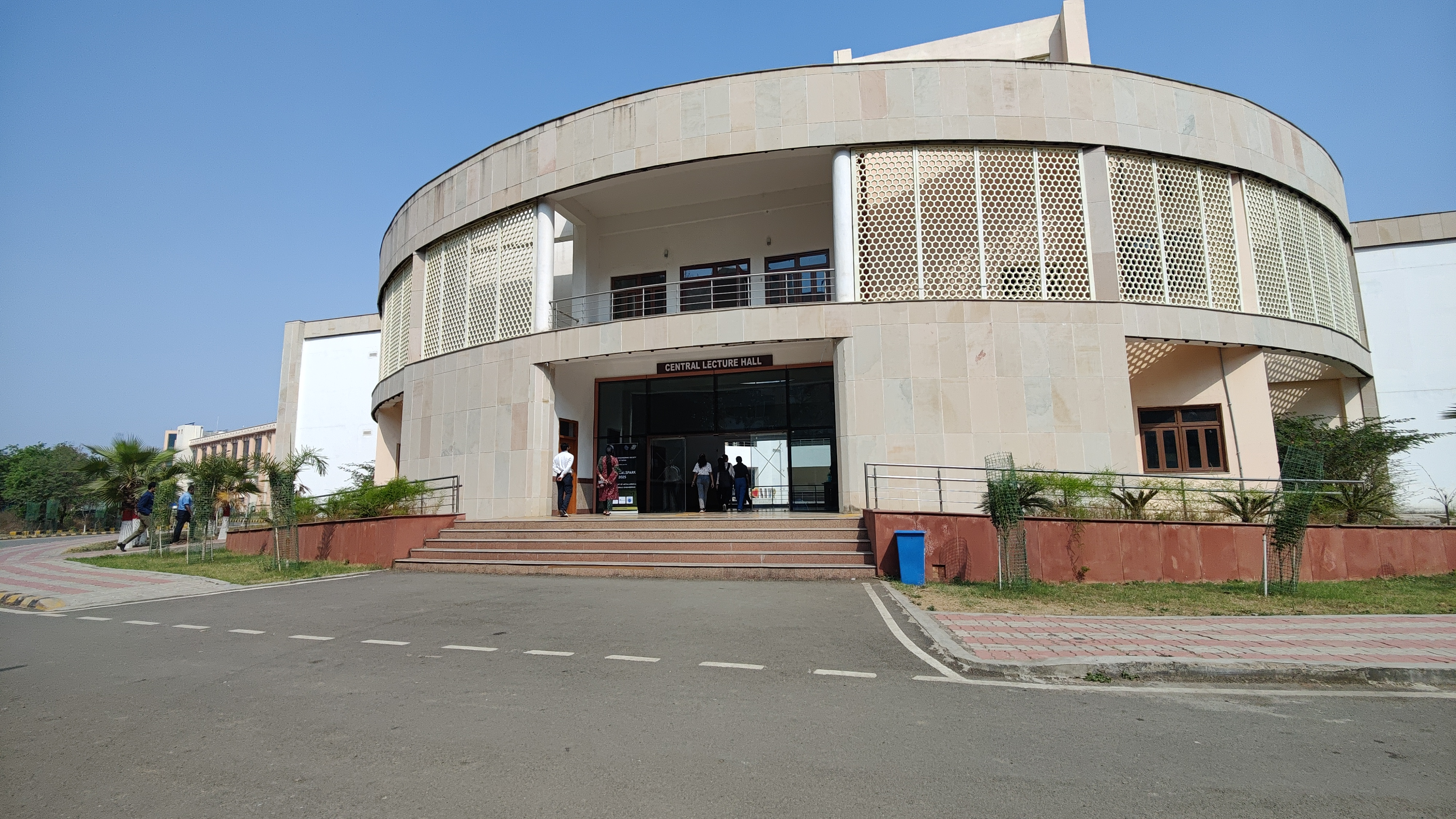
Central Lecture Hall

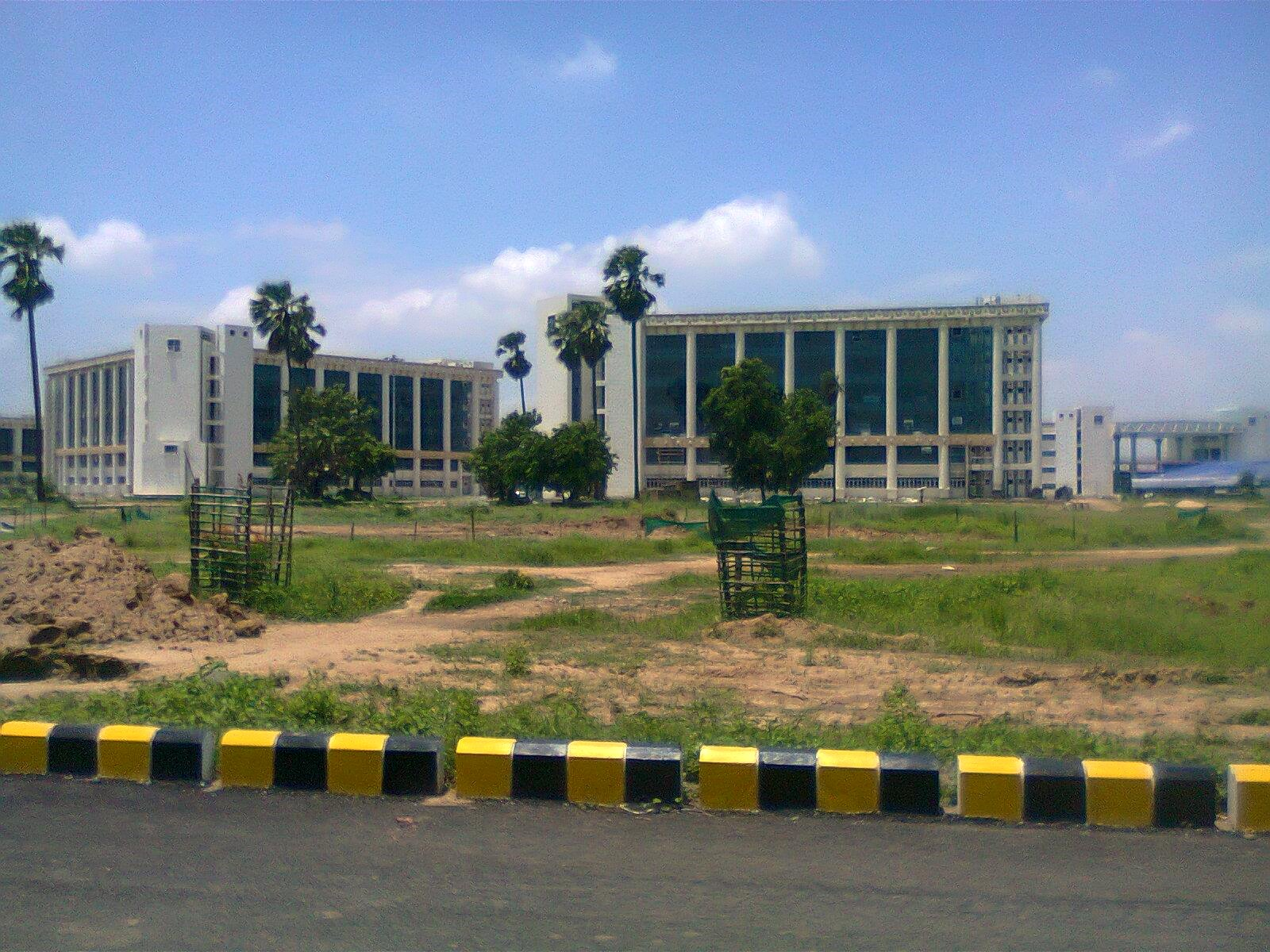
Block 3 (Back Side)

IIT Patna's campus is located at Bihta, 35km from Patna at a 501 acres (203 ha) site. The foundation stone of the IIT Patna, Bihta Campus was laid by Kapil Sibal in 2011. IIT Patna started its new session (from July 2015) in its permanent campus located at Bihta. The campus at Bihta was inaugurated by Prime Minister Shri Narendra Modi on 25 July, 2015. Earlier, the institute operated from a temporary 10 acres (4.0 ha) campus in Pataliputra Colony, Patna, in renovated buildings that were previously used by the New Government Polytechnic, Patna-13.

=== Administrative Building ===
This is the main building of the campus that can be viewed directly from the campus main gate. It houses all the administrative offices, the Central Library, the Directorate, offices of all the Deans and other officials.

=== Chemical and Biochemical Engineering Block (Block 6) ===
The Department of Chemical and Biochemical Engineering was instituted in 2015. It is located in the Block-6 of the campus. The department accepted its first undergraduate students in 2016. The Block-6 houses research facilities for its faculty members in various research fields ranging from Clean fuel production, CO_{2} capture and storage, Pinch analysis, Microwave-assisted heating, Process modelling and simulation to Bio-resource engineering and Wastewater treatment. The department has also set up various laboratories for its undergraduate students including Heat transfer laboratory, Mechanical Operations laboratory, Chemical Reaction Engineering laboratory, Process simulation laboratory among many others.

=== Humanities and Social Sciences Block (Block 1) ===
The Department of Humanities and Social Sciences is located in Block 1.

The department has also set up a Centre for Endangered Language Studies to work for the minor/ tribal/endangered languages of the state of Bihar and adjoining areas. In addition, the centre aims to collaborate with the institutes and universities of the neighbouring states to work for minor/ tribal/endangered languages along the state borders.

== Organisation and administration ==
=== Governance ===
All IITs follow the same organization structure which has the President of India at the top of the hierarchy. Directly under the president is the IIT Council. Under the IIT Council is the board of governors of each IIT. Under the board of governors is the director, who is the chief academic and executive officer of the IIT. Under the director, in the organizational structure, comes the deputy director. Under the director and the deputy director, come the deans, heads of departments, registrar.

=== Departments and Centres ===
The institute has the following departments and centres, which conduct research as well as provide education.

==== Departments ====
- Chemical and Bio-Chemical Engineering (CBE)
- Civil and Environmental Engineering (CEE)
- Computer Science and Engineering (CSE)
- Electrical Engineering (EE)
- Mechanical Engineering (ME)
- Metallurgical and Materials Engineering (MME)
- Chemistry (CHY)
- Mathematics (MA)
- Physics (PHY)
- Humanities and Social Sciences (HSS)

==== Centres ====
- Centre for Endangered Language Studies (CELS)
- Centre for Earthquake Engineering Research (CEER)
- Centre for Educational Technology (CET)
- Incubation Centre (IC)
- Student Activity Centre (SAC)

== Academics ==
=== Undergraduate programs ===
The undergraduate programs at the Indian Institute of Technology Patna lead to the degrees of Bachelor of Technology (B.Tech.), Bachelor of Science (B.Sc.), Bachelor of Business Administration (BBA), and corresponding dual-degree programs.

IIT Patna awards bachelor's degrees in the following disciplines:

- Bachelor of Technology in Computer Science and Engineering (CSE)
- Bachelor of Technology in Mathematics and Computing (MnC)
- Bachelor of Technology in Artificial Intelligence and Data Science (AI&DS)
- Bachelor of Technology in Electrical and Electronics Engineering (EEE)
- Bachelor of Technology in Mechanical Engineering (ME)
- Bachelor of Technology in Civil and Environmental Engineering (CEE)
- Bachelor of Technology in Chemical Engineering (CHE)
- Bachelor of Technology in Metallurgical and Materials Engineering (MME)
- Bachelor of Technology in Engineering Physics (EP)
- Bachelor of Technology in Electronics and Communication Engineering (ECE)
- Bachelor of Technology in Chemical Science and Technology (CST)
- Bachelor of Science in Economics (ES)
- Bachelor of Business Administration (BBA)
- Bachelor of Science in Computer Science and Data Analytics (CSDA)
- Bachelor of Science in Artificial Intelligence and Cybersecurity (AICS)

The CSDA, AICS, and BBA programs are offered in hybrid mode of instruction and admit students through an application process. Counselling for these programs is not conducted through the Joint Seat Allocation Authority (JoSAA).

=== Postgraduate programs ===
Postgraduate programs at IIT Patna include:

- Master of Technology (M.Tech.)
- Master of Science (M.S.)
- Doctor of Philosophy (Ph.D.)
- Executive Master of Business Administration (Executive MBA)

=== Hybrid programs ===
IIT Patna offers the following programs through a hybrid mode of instruction:

- Bachelor of Science–Master of Science (BS–MS) in Computer Science and Data Analytics
- Bachelor of Science–Master of Science (BS–MS) in Artificial Intelligence and Cybersecurity
- Bachelor of Science (Honors) in Computer Science and Data Analytics
- Bachelor of Science (Honors) in Artificial Intelligence and Cybersecurity
- Executive Master of Business Administration (Executive MBA) with dual specialization
- Executive Master of Business Administration (Executive MBA) in Finance
- Executive Master of Technology (Executive M.Tech.) in Artificial Intelligence and Data Science Engineering
- Executive Master of Technology (Executive M.Tech.) in Computer Science and Engineering with specializations in Big Data and Blockchain Technology, Cloud Computing, Internet of Things (IoT), and related areas

=== Master of Technology ===
The M.Tech. program was introduced in 2012 and offers degrees in the following disciplines:

- Master of Technology in Mathematics and Computing
- Master of Technology in Artificial Intelligence
- Master of Technology in Mechatronics
- Master of Technology in Computer Science and Engineering
- Master of Technology in Communication Systems Engineering
- Master of Technology in Metallurgical and Materials Engineering
- Master of Technology in Civil Engineering
- Master of Technology in VLSI and Embedded Systems
- Master of Technology in Mechanical Design

=== Doctoral programs ===
The Doctor of Philosophy (Ph.D.) program was introduced in 2009. Ph.D. degrees are awarded across the institute's departments. Admission generally requires a master's degree and prior academic achievement.

=== Rankings ===
University rankings

General – international
- QS (Asia) (2023): 351–400
- Times (World) (2023): 801

General – India
- NIRF (Overall) (2024): 36

Engineering – India
- NIRF (2024): 19

Internationally, Indian Institute of Technology Patna was placed in the 351–400 band in Asia in the 2023 edition of the QS Asia University Rankings. The institute was also ranked 801 globally by the Times Higher Education World University Rankings in 2023.

In India, IIT Patna was ranked 19th among engineering institutions and 36th overall by the National Institutional Ranking Framework (NIRF) in 2025.

=== Incubation Centre (IC) ===
The Incubation Centre is supported by the Government of Bihar and the Department of Electronics and Information Technology (DeitY), Ministry of Communications and IT, Government of India.

The building for the IC was on 24 November 2018.The Chief Guest for the ceremony was the Deputy Chief Minister of Bihar, Shri Sushil Kumar Modi.

A Class 1000 clean room (also known as ISO6 clean room), which utilizes high-efficiency particulate absorbing (HEPA) filtration system to maintain air cleanliness level of a maximum of 1,000 particles of more than 0.5 micron per cubic meter inside air, was inaugurated inside Incubation Centre on 13 September 2023 by the state information technology minister Mohd Israil Mansuri.

=== Collaboration with foreign universities ===
The International Relations Cell at IIT Patna is responsible for the entire institute's international activity. The IR Affairs office is committed to increasing international collaboration through exchange visits, and opening up international conversations by encouraging universities stakeholders to set up joint programs, joint research and projects, faculty exchange and internships for international students.

IIT Patna has collaborated with foreign universities National University of Singapore (NUS), University of Houston, Texas (USA), Louisiana State University (USA), University of Hartford, Connecticut (USA), University of Missouri, Columbia (USA), University of New South Wales(Australia), University of North Texas, Denton (USA) and University of Saskatchewan(Canada).

The MoU is intended to give opportunities to BTech, MTech and PhD students and faculty from IIT Patna to go to the United States, Australia, Singapore and Canada and develop their research skills and interact with people working in different areas of science and technology.

== Student life and culture ==
=== Societies ===
The Student Activity Center operates with the following societies:

- IEEE Student Branch IIT-Patna
- Science and Technology Council
  - NJACK (Computer Science Club)
  - Sparkonics (Electrical Engineering Club)
  - SCME (Mechanical Engineering Society)
  - Robotics Club (3 Divisions - Rocketry and Aviation Club, Tinkerer's Lab, and Team Phoenix ROBOCON)
  - Finance Club
  - IITP Motorsports
  - ACE (Civil Engineering Society)
  - CHESSx (Chemical Engineering Society)
  - OptimatX (Mathematics Society)
  - MatES (Materials Engineering Society)
- House of Socio-Cultural Affairs
  - Standup Den (Comedy Club)
  - Pixxel (Photography Club)
  - Aria (Music Club)
  - Exousia (Dance Club)
  - Yavanika (Dramatics Club)
  - Quiz Club
  - House of Oratory Talents (HOOT) (Speaking Arts)
  - Syahi (Literature Club)
  - Vincetroke (Fine arts club)
  - Anime Club
  - Hexachrome (Puzzle Solving Club)
- Research Community (under Academics and Career Council)
- Trading and Investment Club (TIC)
- Sports clubs (of respective sports activities)
- Bhaktivedanta Club
- Entrepreneurship Club
- Rural Technology Development Club (RTDC)
- National Service Scheme (NSS), IIT Patna
- National Sports Organization (India), IIT Patna

=== Festivals ===
There are three major festivals that are organized in IIT Patna namely, Anwesha, Celesta and Infinito.

Celesta, the annual techno-management fest of Indian Institute of Technology, Patna is held generally in the month of October–November every year.

Anwesha, the annual techno-cultural fest of Indian Institute of Technology, Patna is held in the month of January–February every year.

== See also ==
- Indian Institutes of Technology
- List of universities in India
- Ministry of Human Resource Development (India)
