= Wedding Anniversary =

2017 Indian film by Shekhar S Jha

- Directed by: Shekhar S Jha
- Written by: Shekhar S Jha; Rashid Iqbal
- Produced by: Kumar V Mahant; Achut Naik
- Starring: Nana Patekar; Mahie Gill; Priyanshu Chatterjee; Sanket Choukse
- Cinematography: Shanti Bhushan Roy
- Edited by: Aseem Sinha
- Music by: Abhishek Ray
- Production company: V K Productions
- Distributed by: Bharat Shah
- Release date: 24 February 2017
- Running time: 108 minutes
- Country: India
- Language: Hindi
- Box office: ₹0.24 crore

Wedding Anniversary is a 2017 Indian Hindi-language romantic drama film, directed by Shekhar S Jha, produced by Kumar V Mahant and Achut Naik, and presented by Bharat Shah. The film stars Nana Patekar and Mahie Gill in leading roles and was released on 24 February 2017.

== Plot ==
Kahani (Mahie Gill) and her husband Nirbhay (Priyanshu Chatterjee) had planned to celebrate their wedding anniversary in Goa, but due to some last-minute work, Nirbhay stayed back and Kahani had to travel alone. While she waits for her husband in Goa, she picks up a book to read written by her favourite author, Nagarjun (Nana Patekar). After a short while, a visitor rings the doorbell of her house, who turns out to be none other than Nagarjun himself. The conversation that follows between the two, involves Nagarjun talking about love, its true meaning, and the relevance it has in our lives, and it forms the crux of the film.

== Cast ==
- Nana Patekar as Nagarjun
- Mahi Gill as Kahani
- Priyanshu Chatterjee as Nirbhay
- Sanket Choukse
- Shruti Marathe
- Priya Tandon in a cameo appearance
- Asma Badar
- Kanika Dang
- Sneha Gupta
- Bhumika Gurung
- Yatin Karyekar
- Asad Khan
- Krishanu
- Abhishek Ray
- Rahul Prakash
- Shanti Bhushan Roy
- Neha Sharma
- Shruti Sharma
- Bhupesh Singh
- Yajuvendra Singh
- Tamara
- Tejan Yadav

== Production ==
=== Filming ===
The entire shooting of the film was done in Goa in May and June 2015.

== Soundtrack ==
Happy Anniversary

Soundtrack album by Abhishek Ray
- Released: 6 February 2018
- Genre: Feature film soundtrack
- Length: 21:25
- Language: Hindi
- Label: Zee Music Company
External audio
- Audio Jukebox on YouTube

The music is composed by Abhishek Ray, while the lyrics have been written by Abhiruchi & Manvendra. The music rights were bought by Zee Music Company.

All music is composed by Abhishek Ray.

Tracklist
No.	Title	Lyrics	Singer(s)	Length
1.	"The Rainbow Song"	Abhiruchi Chand	Abhishek Ray & Bhoomi Trivedi	4:12
2.	"Dhinchakk"	Abhiruchi Chand	Abhinanda Sarkar	3:59
3.	"Ittefaqan"	Manvendra	Abhishek Ray & Amika Shail	5:07
4.	"Aaiye Saiyan"	Manvendra	Bhoomi Trivedi	3:36
5.	"Bidesia"	Manvendra	Ustad Rashid Khan and Shirsha	4:31
Total length:				21:25

== Critical reception ==
Mihir Bhanage of The Times of India found the film to be boring and gave it a rating of 2 out of 5 saying that, "If you have issues in your love-life, visit a marriage counsellor. Wedding Anniversary will only add some phrases to your Hindi/Urdu vocabulary." Nandini Ramnath of Scroll said that, "'Wedding Anniversary' is as much fun as a divorce hearing". Vishal Verma of Glamsham gave the film a rating of 1 out of 5 and said that, "Wedding Anniversary is an unintentional horror that makes us wonder what on earth are talents like Nana Patekar and Mahie Gill doing in this flick?"
