= Anwesha =

Annual cultural festival at IIT, Patna

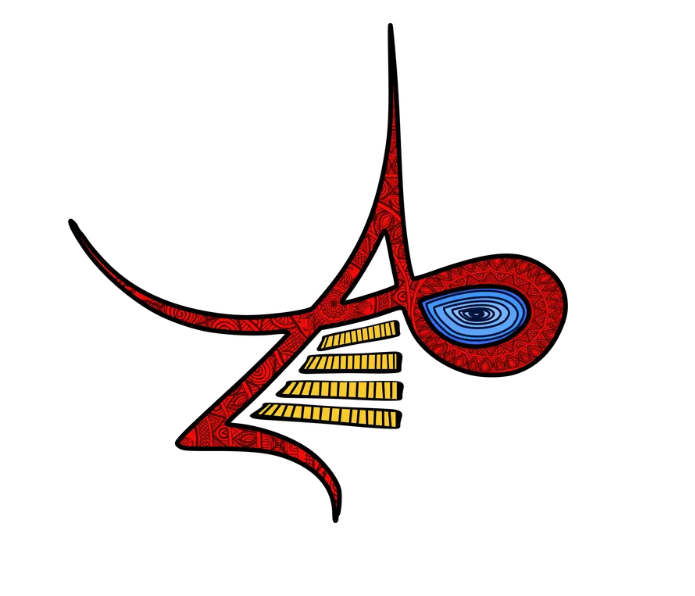
- Genre: Cultural - Management
- Dates: February 7th - 9th (2025)
- Frequency: Annual
- Venue: Indian Institute of Technology Patna
- Location: Patna
- Country: India
- Founded: 2010
- Attendance: 45,000+
- Organizer: The Student Community of IIT Patna
- Motto: Think. Dream. Live.
- Website: anwesha.live

Anwesha is the annual cultural festival of Indian Institute of Technology Patna. It is a three-day-long event that is usually held at the start of February each year.

The fest hosts cultural, literary, ecological and management events. The first edition of Anwesha took place in 2008. It draws a footfall of about 45,000 from more than 250 colleges across the country.

Management events such as Stock Mart, B-quiz, Vendre and ecological events like Eco-debate, Green quiz give participants ample scope to showcase their talents. Anwesha enjoys a cult status among the youths of Bihar. Eminent personalities such as chief minister Nitish Kumar, Padma Vibhushan, G. Madhavan Nair, Ravindra Kumar Sinha (the Dolphin Man of India), have been part of Anwesha in the past.

The theme for the 2025 edition of the festival was Echoes of the Abyss.

== Introduction ==
The event name is derived from the Sanskrit word Anwesha, meaning quest. The first took place in March, 2010 with the aim of helping students gain experience and providing them with a showcase. It was opened by Bihar Chief Minister Nitish Kumar and featured a Hindi rock band comprising IITP students.

The 2011 event was the first to have a corporate co-sponsor: Reliance Communications supported its Pro-Night featuring Sifar.

The involvement of the Campus Ambassador Program for the 2014 event saw the event reach beyond the city of Patna to 250 colleges across India. A total of 52 events were organised, with 17 technical events, 13 cultural events, 9 ecological events and 7 literary events. Six new management events were also introduced in 2014 edition.

The tenth event is scheduled to take place from 1–3 February 2019.

== Events ==
Over the years, pro-nights have starred various artists, rock bands and personalities. These have included the rock bands Sifar (2011), Swarathma (2015) and Euphoria (2016), together with classical music performances from the likes of Kamala Shankar (2012) and Priya Venkataraman (2013). The most famous poet Dr. Kumar Vishwas performed in 2012.

Other attendees have included an audience with Miss India International 2013 Gurleen Grewal (2014) and Miss India Earth 2013 Sobhita Dhulipala (2015).

=== Interactive sessions ===
Year	Keynote Speaker	Title of Session
2010	Dr. Upendra Singh, Chief Technologist, Langley Research Center, NASA	NASA's future vision for earth science missions for global observations and the challenges associated in applying them for societal benefit.
2010	Dr. Kumar Padmanabh, Researcher	Minimizing the carbon emission and restricting air pollution below 350 parts per million.
2011	Prof. Ravindra Kumar Sinha	Conservation of Gangetic Dolphin
2012	Prof. Prabhat Ranjan	Application of Sensor Networks
2013	Prof. Bimal Kumar Roy, Director, Indian Statistical Institute, Kolkata	Statistics, Combinatorics and Cryptology.
2014	Vikram Upadhyaya, Board Member, Indian Angel Network	Setting up Global Ventures and Franchising
2015	Farrhad Acidwalla, Founder, Rockstah Media	Entrepreneurship - Initiative is Everything
2015	Anirudh Sharma, Founder, Ducere Technologies	Entrepreneurship - Walking With the Blind

== Structure ==
Anwesha is an entirely student-run non-profit organization composed of students from over 10 departments selected through several rounds of interviews and appraisal of work history.

The entire team is divided into committees - Events, Sponsorship & Marketing, Web & App, and Hospitality to name a few. For instance the Events committee focuses on formulation and on-site execution of all the events, workshops, and lectures conducted throughout the fest. On the other hand, Web & App caters to technological necessities associated with the same. Each committee further consists of a panel of Coordinators from the Junior Year followed by a group of Sub-Coordinators from the Sophomore Year.

First Years form the Volunteers team where they get introduced to various aspects of event management. The Previous Year’s Core Team act as an Advisory Committee and are responsible for guidance and support over important issues.

The Fest Coordinator (or FC) from the Junior Year is the overall in charge and is responsible for gluing together all the committees.

== Guests ==
Year	Name	Purpose
2010	Nitish Kumar, Chief Minister, Govt. of Bihar	Chief Guest, Inauguration Ceremony
2011	G. Madhavan Nair, Former Chairman of ISRO	Chief Guest, Inauguration Ceremony
2011	G. Mahalingam, executive director, RBI	Guest of Honour for Event Forex
2011	Gautam Barua, Ex-Director, IIT-Guwahati	Guest Lecturer
2012	Abhayanand, Former Director General of Police, Bihar	Chief Guest, Inauguration Ceremony
2013	Ashok Kumar Sinha, Ex-Chief Secretary, Govt of Bihar	Chief Guest, Inauguration Ceremony
2014	Navaniti Prasad Singh, Patna High Court	Chief Guest, Inauguration Ceremony
2014	Shatrughan Sinha, Veteran Actor and Member of Parliament	Chief Guest, Valedictory Ceremony
