= Quark (technical festival) =

Quark, BITS Pilani Goa
- Genre: Technical
- Dates: February
- Frequency: Annually
- Location: Goa, India
- Years active: 16
- Founded: 2006
- Patron: UNESCO
- Organizer: Student community of BITS Pilani, K.K. Birla Goa Campus
- Website: www.bits-quark.org

Quark is the annual international techno-management festival of BITS Pilani, K.K. Birla Goa Campus. It usually takes place in early February, and has thousands of participants.

Launched as a local event in 2006, Quark became a national event in 2008. Since then, Quark has consistently seen participation from colleges across India. It usually features various events pertaining to the different engineering branches as well as the pure sciences, but has more recently expanded the range of events to include various events, related to entrepreneurship. and business.It has grown manifold since its inception in 2006 and has made a name for itself as an avant-garde technical festival, showcasing the latest innovations and hosting pioneers in the fields of science and technology. Since 2013, Quark has been awarded UNESCO Patronage, the highest form of support granted to an organization, being only the third fest in India to receive the same.

== History ==
Quark 2006 was the first version and was an intra-campus competition

Quark 2007 turned Quark into a local inter college Goa festival.

Quark 2008 went national for the first time, featuring participation from colleges across India. It highlights included an aero modelling workshop followed by an air show, a magic show, and a performance by the juggling troupe "Feeding the Fish" from London.

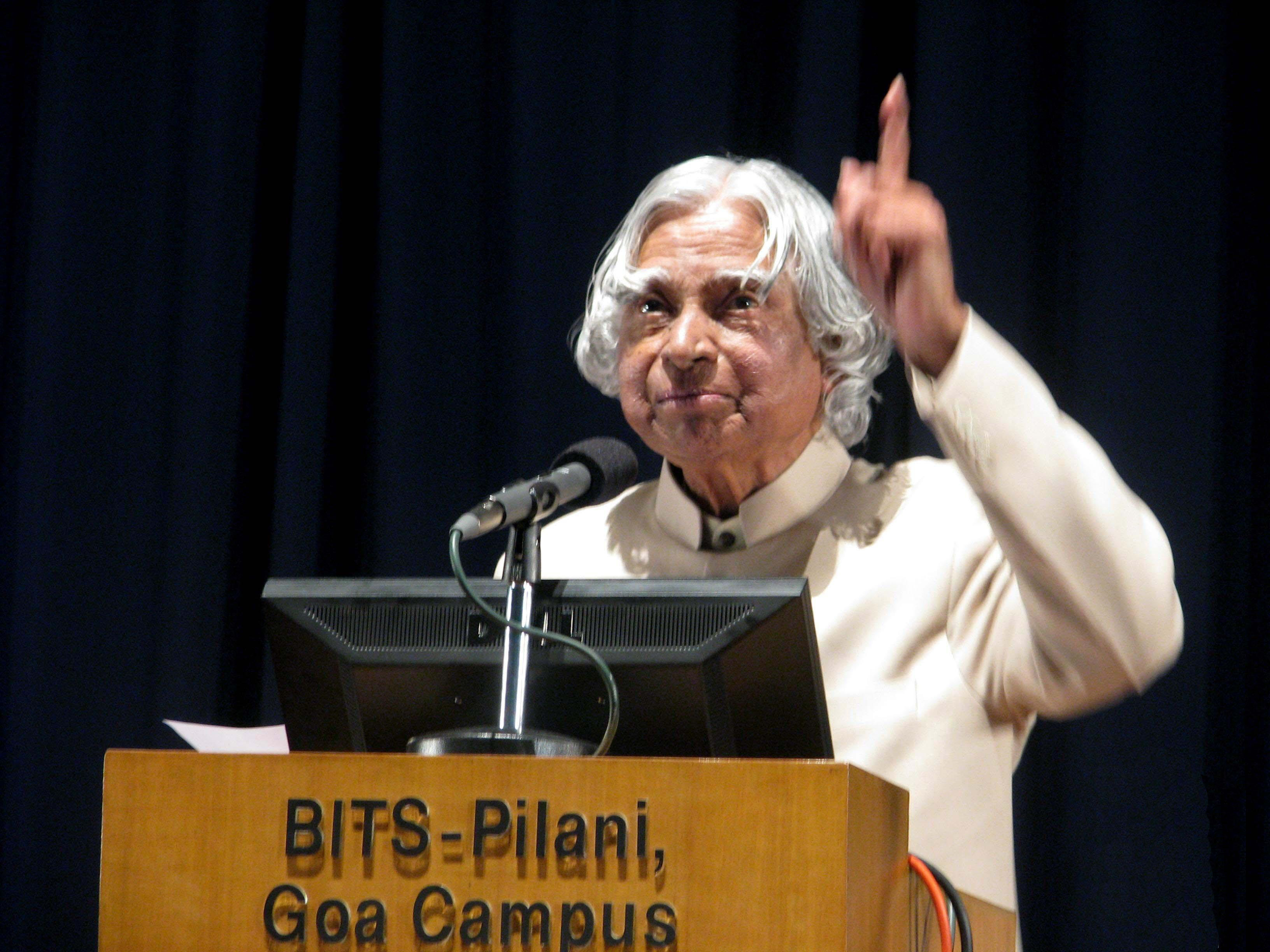
Dr. APJ Abdul Kalam's inaugural speech

Quark 2009 saw greater participation than in the previous edition, playing host to around 5000 students from 350 colleges across India. Dr. APJ Abdul Kalam, former President of India, inaugurated the festival, the inaugural speech also being streamed live to the Pilani Campus. Performances by internationally renowned flutist Padma Vibhushan Pt. Hariprasad Chaurasia and a fire show by the Carnival of the Divine Imagination(rhythmic fire and light performance group from Brisbane, Australia) pulled huge crowds. BITSMUN (BITS Model United Nations) made its maiden appearance during this edition. ACYUT 2, a humanoid robot made by BITS students, was a significant attraction during the 3 days of the festival.

Quark 2010 surpassed its predecessor in terms of popularity as it attracted more than 35,000 students from different national colleges. The festival was inaugurated by the Honorable Chancellor of BITS, Pilani University Mr. Kumar Mangalam Birla. Guest Lectures by Mr. Vic Hayes (known as the Father of Wi-Fi), Nobel Laureates - Prof. Harry Kroto and Prof. Douglas Osheroff, and delegates from Mozilla Foundation were prominent features of Quark 2010. This edition marked the expansion of the festival to international grounds.

Graviton, an off-campus initiative aimed at spreading academic innovation through a workshop series on Ethical hacking (GEHWS) and Robotics (GRWS), was organized in the buildup to the festival. This edition of Quark also saw a series of workshops on Fuel Cell Development, Social Media Marketing and Application development on the Windows 7 platform, amongst others.

== Logo ==
The Quark logo highlights the festival's continuous growth, as well as the innovative nature of the festival. This representation is displayed via the left half of the logo resembling a blueprint. The right half resembles a developed Quark, representing passion, unity, teamwork, thought and creativity. The Quark banner represents innovation.

== Events ==
Quark has bloomed under various panels such as:

1. Electrify

2. Roboficial

3. Design and Build

4. Programmers' Inc.

5. Corporate

6. Elixir

7. Initiatives

8. Specials

9. Quark Summer Technical Projects

== Specials ==
=== BITSMUN ===
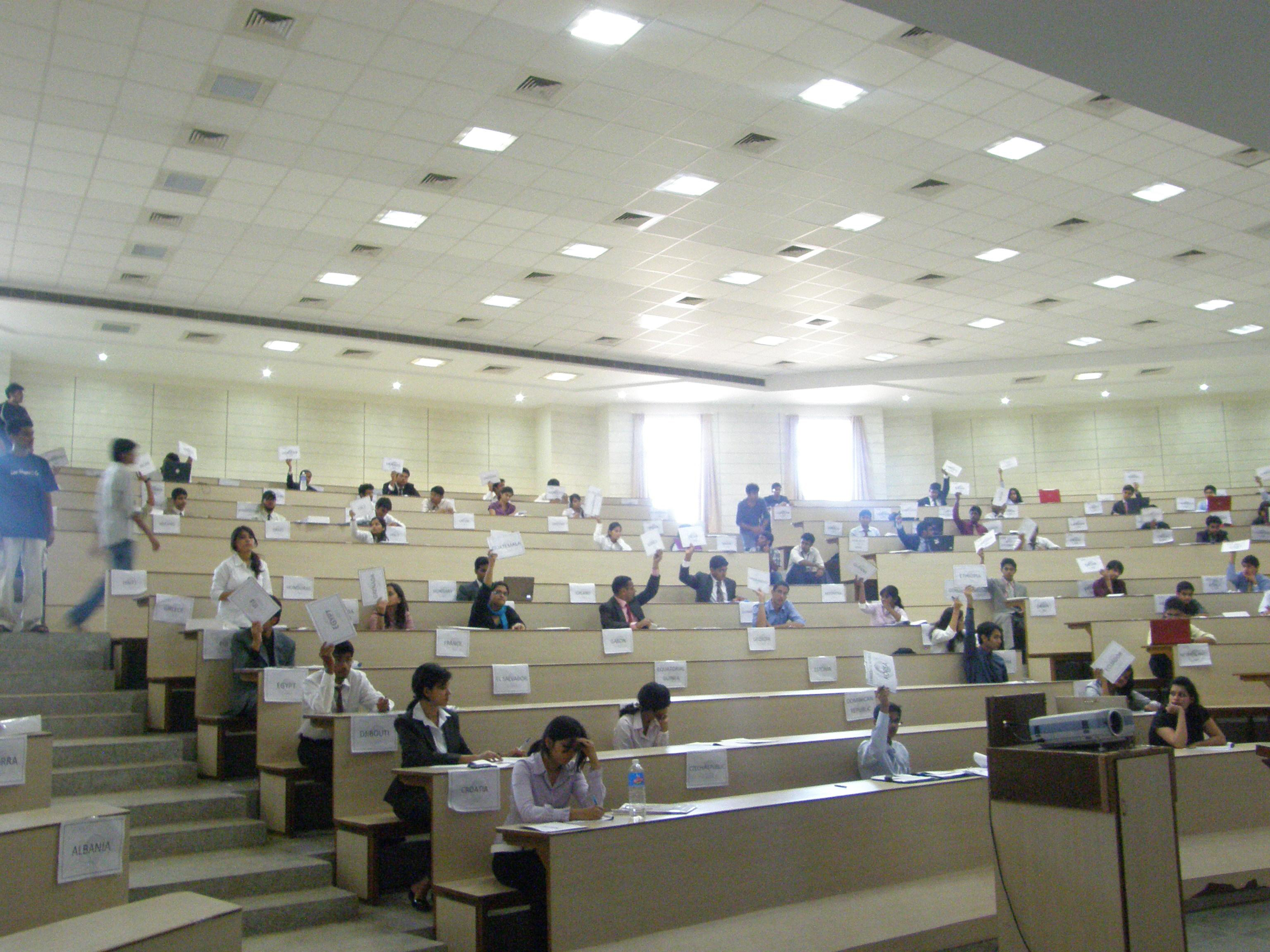
BITSMUN General Assembly in progress

BITSMUN (BITS Model United Nations) is a United Nations simulation, held with an aim to educate participants in civics, current events, effective public speaking, globalization and multilateral diplomacy. The event follows the standard MUN format, in which participants take up roles as international diplomats or delegates and engage in a simulated United Nations conference. BITSMUN is spread over three days, consisting of an inauguration ceremony on Day 1 and a Delegates Ball on Day 2 in addition to two daily sessions of 3 hours on all three days.

=== Exhibitions, workshops and guest lectures ===
Several workshops were conducted during the course of Quark 2010. As part of 'Corporate' events, a Six Sigma workshop by KPMG was held. An Adobe Flex workshop was conducted to familiarize students with the Adobe Flex software development kit along with a PSoC workshop by Cypress Semiconductors. In addition to this, there were exhibitions by DRDO, CSIR and ISRO.

For Quark 2013, there were workshops by Wikimedia gadget development for MediaWiki and the Python Wikipedia bot framework (or PyWikipediaBot) used for automating tasks on a wiki. Other workshops included learning vision robotics, Raspberry Pi and WSN by Inventrom and the like.

Quark, in its recent editions, has also presented Guest Lectures by Nobel Laureates Sir Harry Kroto, Prof. Douglas Osheroff and Mr. Vic Hayes. It has also had leading professors such as MIT Emeritus professor of Physics, Walter Lewin in the 2014 edition.

=== Aurora ===
Aurora refers to the special performances during the nights of Quark. Recent performers include the London-based troupe 'Feeding the Fish'(performers at the 2004 Athens Olympics) and 'The Carnival of Divine Imagination' from Australia. The institute's own dance, mime, music and drama clubs also perform at these nights.

== Corporate social responsibility ==
=== Red ===
Quark has also been a promoter of social responsibilities. Using the wide geographical reach of the organizers, Quark started a nationwide blood donation initiative called Red that increased awareness of blood donation in India. It was initiated in collaboration with the Indian Red Cross Society. It was started with a goal to increase awareness and dispel irrational fears about blood donation in the youth of India. It also aims to increase the voluntary blood donors database in India in an effort to make a difference in health care facilities across the country

== Sponsorship ==
Quark, with a footfall exceeding 30,000, witnesses participation from over 200 colleges from across India. Since its inception, Quark has attracted sponsorship associations from companies including Sabre, eBay, IBM, Mahindra, Toyota, Cypress Semiconductors, CEAT, Honeywell, Applied Materials and Syngenta.

== Media ==
Over the years, Quark has had associations with various media outlets such as The Hindu, Hindustan times, The Times of India, Big FM, Radio Mirchi, BBC Knowledge Magazine, Digit, Business Economics magazine and several others. Quark has also been covered by magazines such as Engineering Review, Exhibit, Electronics For You, Power Learning and Youth Inc magazine for the past few years. Also, Quark has been extensively featured on several websites and social media pages like ScoopWhoop and The Scribbled Stories. Besides this Quark has been widely covered by Goan TV channels, Newspapers and magazines.
