= New Government Polytechnic, Patna-13 =

New Government Polytechnic Patna-13
- नवीन राजकीय बहुतकनीकी, पटना-13
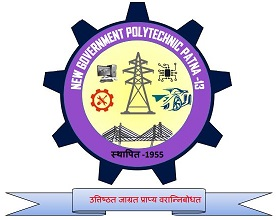
- Official logo of NGP Patna-13
- Motto: उतिष्ठत जाग्रत प्राप्य वरान्निबोधत
- Type: Government
- Established: 1955 (71 years ago)
- Affiliations: State Board of Technical Education, Bihar (SBTE Bihar), Patna
- Principal: Shree Chandrashekhar Singh
- Academic staff: 24
- Administrative staff: 40
- Students: 604
- Location: Patliputra, Patna, Bihar, India
- Campus: Urban
- Website: www.ngpp.ac.in

New Government Polytechnic, Patliputra, Patna- 800013, (NGPP13) is among the premier Technical Institutes of Bihar and of the country at large having a distinct aura and stature. Started in 1955 as a School of Engineering, it initially offered Diploma Courses in Civil, Electrical and Mechanical Engineering. Ever on fast track of development it has undergone expansion and transformation keeping pace with the changing contour of Technical Education in the Country. With its added length, breadth and dimension there has been opening of emerging areas in Engineering and Technology like Electronics, Computer and Automobile. Simultaneously there has been ongoing innovations and up gradation in course contents and in teaching and training methodologies in sync with India’s emerging as a technological superpower and the hub of developing technologies and technical manpower. Needless to say, the Institute has scaled new heights and established standards of excellence duly recognized by its entitlement as An Institute of Excellence by All India Council for Technical Education (AICTE).The Institute is situated between the posh residential Patliputra colony and the Industrial Estste. Its surrounding areas within a radius of 10 km. is a veritable mix of the old and new: sylvan landscape and greenery jostling with modernist brands. The area also contains some precious relics of our recent past: Sadaqat Ashram, Rajendra Sangrahalaya and Braj Kishore Bhawan are glowing emblems of our Freedom Movement. About 2km from Institute gate flows the holy Ganga, whose ever flowing and ever changing currents beckon us to our march towards our grand destiny. Since its establishment, this Polytechnic institute has provided the Diploma in engineering in various branches of engineering. It is the first polytechnic institute in Bihar to achieve National Board of Accreditation (NBA) recognition. While individual institutions carry standard governmental operational guidelines, its controlling board—the SBTE Bihar—is an ISO 9001:2015 certified body (License No. CM/L-0004515 via Bureau of Indian Standards), ensuring that the curriculum, exam cycles, and standard teaching patterns map precisely to international quality management guidelines.

== Branches ==
The institute offers full-time and part-time Diplomas in following branches:

- Civil engineering
- Mechanical engineering
- Electrical engineering
- Automobile engineering
- Computer engineering
- Electronics engineering

== Admission ==
Successful candidates obtain admission after allotment by the final merit list in the DCECE Entrance Examination conducted by BCECEB, Patna.

== Institution facilities ==
The institute offers facilities including a library, workshop, and practical laboratories. Hostels are available to house both men and women separately. The Wi-Fi campus is available exclusively for office use.
