= Sifar (band) =

Indian rock band

- Origin: Delhi, India
- Genres: Rock, Alternative
- Years active: 2008–present
- Label: Universal Music
- Members: Amit Yadav; Anshul Bansal; Deepak Singh; Sachin Mittra
- Past members: Nikhil Auluck; Yapang Lemtür
- Website: sifar.in

Sifar is a rock band from Delhi, India, formed in 2008 by Singer, songwriter, and music producer Amit Yadav. The band was previously signed to Universal Music.

== History ==
Sifar was formed in 2008, when Amit recorded his version of one of his friend Anshul's songs. Until this point, they had tried finding the right band/ artist for their songs without any success. Anshul loved the music done by Amit and they decided to upload the song along with one of Amit's songs on the internet. They soon started gathering an audience online. Encouraged by the response, Amit decided to pursue music production professionally and enrolled in a music production course run by renowned music producer and composer Gaurav Dayal at Beatfactory Academy.

After completion of the course, Amit started producing songs again in late 2009. By the end of 2010, Amit and Anshul had, together, written 10 new songs, which Amit had arranged, performed and produced at his home studio. They continued publishing the songs online on their website on a regular basis. Eight of these songs were also published in the popular computer technology magazine Digit's Annual Issue in December 2010.

By the end of 2010, Sifar had started performing live as well. The live lineup included Deepak Singh on drums, Yapang Lemtür on bass, and Nikhil Auluck on guitars in addition to Amit on vocals, and guitars. They have performed at some significant venues in India like IIT Roorkee, IIT Gandhinagar, IIT Patna, ISB Hyderabad, IIT Guwahati, and have also performed on Delhi's popular radio stations HIT 95 FM, Radio One 94.3 FM and Radio City 91.1 FM

At the start of 2011, Amit started recording the songs at Beatfactory Music studio. As with previously home recorded demos, he continued to perform and record vocals, guitars, and synthesizers himself in addition to handling the arrangement and production. Drums were now performed by Deepak, and bass guitar was now being performed by Yapang. They released a three track EP in June 2011. One of the songs from the EP got featured in the August 2011 edition of the Rolling Stone (India) Magazine. The band released their first full-length album, titled 1 in October 2011.

In November 2011, the band got nominated for "Best Rock Band" category in the IndieGo Music Awards. Other nominations from the same awards included the song "Main Jaaonga" nominated for "Best Rock Song", Amit got nominated for the "Best Rock Vocalist" category, and the song "Gunah" got nominated for "Genre Bending Song" category. A review of band's album 1 was published in the January 2012 issue of The Score Magazine. Earlier, Music Aloud also published a rave review of the album.

== Discography ==
Title: 1

Released on 18 October 2011

Track list:

No.	Title	Writer(s)	Length
1.	"Main Jaaonga"	Amit Yadav	3:27
2.	"Roko Na Mujhe"	Anshul Bansal	3:16
3.	"Chal Diye"	Amit Yadav	3:12
4.	"Mita Do"	Amit Yadav	4:16
5.	"Gunah"	Amit Yadav	3:36
6.	"Raasta"	Anshul Bansal	3:17
7.	"Aakhiri Din"	Anshul Bansal	4:36
8.	"Kala Aasman"	Anshul Bansal	3:55
9.	"Commonwealth Insaan"	Amit Yadav	3:53
10.	"TV"	Amit Yadav	2:24

Title: 2

Released on 2 December 2013

Track list:

No.	Title	Writer(s)	Length
1.	"Daastan"	Amit Yadav	3:20
2.	"Shaitan"	Amit Yadav	4:15
3.	"Aaj Kal"	Amit Yadav	3:11
4.	"Tarse"	Amit Yadav and Anshul Bansal	3:45
5.	"Dhuan"	Anshul Bansal	3:00
6.	"Sapney"	Amit Yadav	4:00
7.	"Chhattis Baar Suna"	Amit Yadav	1:59
8.	"Mita Do (Remix by Sachin Mittra)"	Amit Yadav	4:55

Title: 3

Released on 16 September 2016

Track list:

No.	Title	Writer(s)	Length
1.	"Bhakt"	Amit Yadav	3:48
2.	"Far Away"	Amit Yadav	3:19
3.	"Yehi Zindagi Hai"	Amit Yadav	4:32
4.	"You Got Me Wrong"	Amit Yadav	3:24
5.	"Armaan Fir Kyun"	Amit Yadav	3:27
6.	"Main Khuda Hun"	Anshul Bansal	3:41
7.	"Fanaa"	Amit Yadav & Shivangi Bhayana	4:35
8.	"Dil Ki Sada (Remix by Naren)"	Amit Yadav	3:14

Title: 4

Released on 21 March 2019

Track list:

No.	Title	Writer(s)	Length
1.	"Sawera"	Amit Yadav	4:08
2.	"Wajood"	Amit Yadav	3:19
3.	"Mere Haal Ki"	Amit Yadav	3:58
4.	"Laal Rang"	Amit Yadav	4:00
5.	"Teri Baatein"	Akshay Agarwal & Gaurav Tiwari	4:03
6.	"Intezaar"	Amit Yadav	3:31
7.	"Teri Baatein[Heavy]"	Akshay Agarwal & Gaurav Tiwari	4:16

Title: Null Session

Released on 1 April 2019

Track list:

No.	Title	Writer(s)	Length
1.	"Kabhi Milenge(Live)"	Amit Yadav	3:24
2.	"Sawera(Live)"	Amit Yadav	4:12
3.	"Armaan(Live)"	Amit Yadav	3:26
4.	"Mere Haal Ki(Live)"	Amit Yadav	3:58
5.	"Gunah(Live)"	Amit Yadav	3:42
6.	"Mita Do(Live)"	Amit Yadav	4:20
7.	"Fanaa(Live)"	Amit Yadav	5:00
