= Poets of the Fall discography =

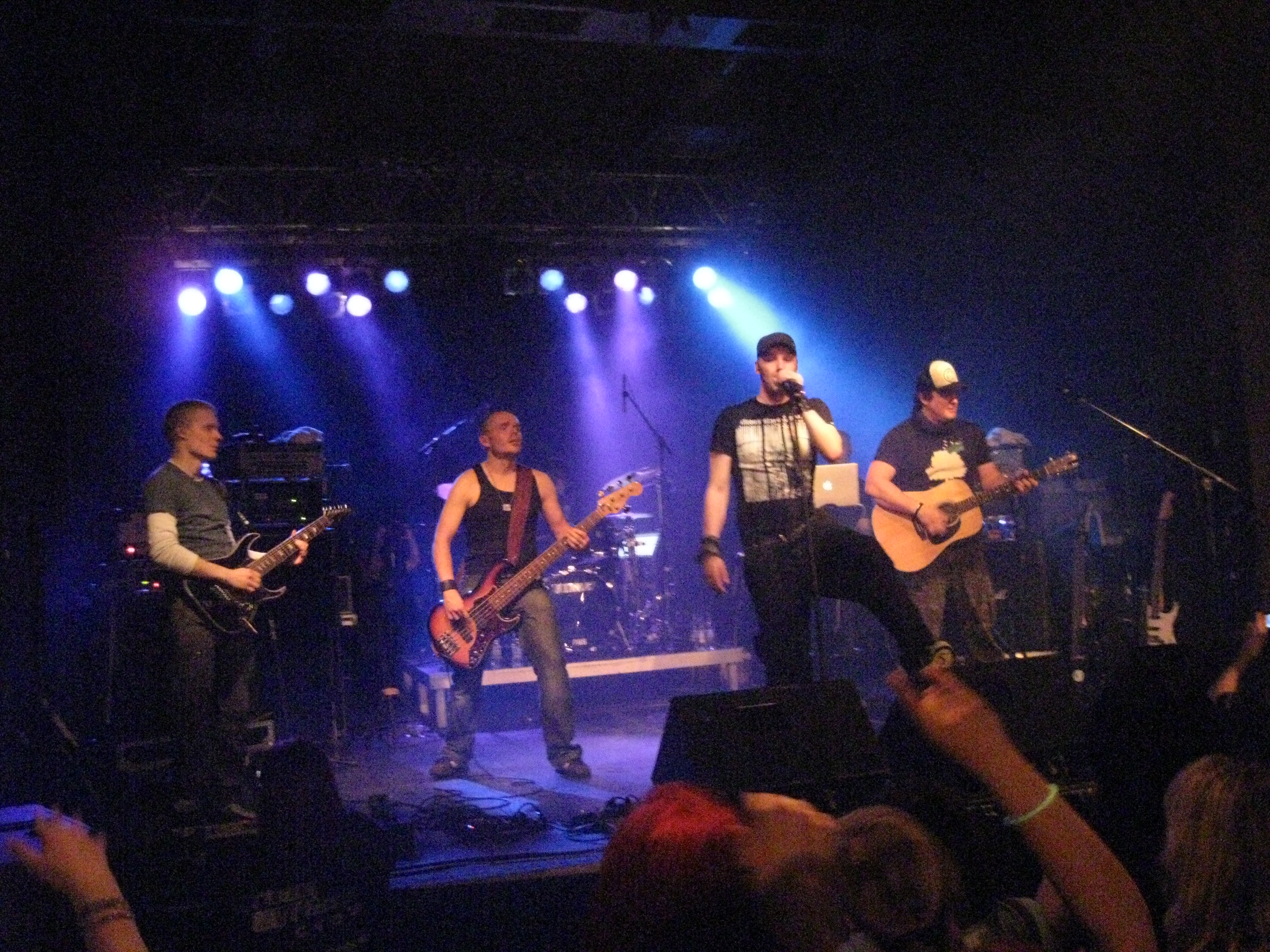
- Poets of the Fall performing in 2008
- Studio albums: 9
- EPs: 1
- Live albums: 2
- Compilation albums: 4
- Singles: 23
- Video albums: 1
- Music videos: 24

Finnish rock band Poets of the Fall have released nine studio albums, two live albums, four compilation albums, one video albums, one extended play, 23 singles, and 24 music videos (including the ones released as Old Gods of Asgard). Poets of the Fall was formed in Helsinki, in 2003 by Marko Saaresto (lead vocals), Olli Tukiainen (lead guitar), and Markus Kaarlonen (keyboards, production). Jani Snellman (bass), Jaska Mäkinen (rhythm guitar) and Tapio (drums) were later recruited as touring members, and in 2006, with the replacement of Tapio with Jari Salminen (lead vocals), the three were added to the band's official lineup.

The band is known for their partnership with video game developers, most notably, with Remedy Entertainment, having written songs for Max Payne 2: The Fall of Max Payne (2003), Alan Wake (2010), Alan Wake's American Nightmare (2012), Control (2019), and Alan Wake 2 (2023), the latter four under the pseudonym Old Gods of Asgard.

== Albums ==
=== Studio albums ===
Year	Album	Release	Charts			Certifications
Year	Album	Release	FIN	UK DL	UK Indie	Certifications
2005	Signs of Life	19 January 2005 (Finland); 25 May 2005 (iTunes); 19 January 2011 (Limited Edition Vinyl – official webshop); 11 July 2014 (Spotify)	1	—	—	IFPI FIN: Platinum
2006	Carnival of Rust	12 April 2006 (Finland, iTunes); 12 September 2006 (Sweden); 6 October 2006 (Australia, Russia, Ukraine); 20 April 2007 (Germany); 18 July 2014 (Spotify)	1	—	—	IFPI FIN: Platinum
2008	Revolution Roulette	26 March 2008 (Finland, iTunes); 25 July 2014 (Spotify)	1	—	—	IFPI FIN: Gold
2010	Twilight Theater	17 March 2010 (Finland, iTunes); 29 October 2010 (Germany, Austria, Switzerland); 1 August 2014 (Spotify)	1	—	—	IFPI FIN: Gold
2012	Temple of Thought	21 March 2012 (Finland); 20 July 2012 (Germany); 8 August 2014 (Spotify); 17 July 2015 (Limited Edition Vinyl)	3	—	—	
2014	Jealous Gods	19 September 2014 (Finland, iTunes, Spotify)	1	—	—	
2016	Clearview	30 September 2016 (Finland, iTunes, Spotify)	2	100	—	
2018	Ultraviolet	5 October 2018 (iTunes, Spotify)	1	41	47	
2022	Ghostlight	29 April 2022	2	23	—	
"—" denotes a recording that did not chart or was not released in that territory.

=== Compilation albums ===
Year	Compilation	Medium	Release	Charts		
Year	Compilation	Medium	Release	FIN	UK DL	UK Indie Brk.
2009	Best of Poets of the Fall	CD	18 September 2009 (India)	—	—	—
2011	Alchemy Vol.1	CD+DVD	16 March 2011	9	—	—
2016	Instrumental Collection, Vol. 1^{[A]}	Digital download	19 February 2016	—	—	—
2023	Rebirth – Greatest Hits (as Old Gods of Asgard)	CD, LP	8 December 2023	1	18	5

Notes

- A Also available as a bundle with Live in Moscow 2013

=== Live albums ===
Year	Compilation	Medium	Release	Charts
Year	Compilation	Medium	Release	FIN
2016	Live in Moscow 2013^{[B]}	Digital download	19 February 2016	—
2020	Alexander Theatre Sessions	CD + Vinyl + Cassette	11 December 2020	2

Notes

- BAlso available as a bundle with Instrumental Collection, Vol. 1

== EPs ==
Year	EP	Medium	Release	Charts
Year	EP	Medium	Release	FIN
2016	Memory Thought Balance Ruin^{[C]} (as Old Gods of Asgard)	Digital download (iTunes only)	19 February 2016	—

Notes

- CAlso available as a bundle with Rochard (Original Game Soundtrack) and later included on Rebirth - Greatest Hits in its entirety

== Singles ==
Year	Single	Release	Charts	Album
Year	Single	Release	FIN	Album
2004	"Late Goodbye"	30 June 2004 (Finland)	14	Signs of Life
2004	"Lift"	9 September 2004 (Finland)	8	Signs of Life
2006	"Carnival of Rust"	22 March 2006 (Finland); 1 December 2006 (Germany)	2	Carnival of Rust
2006	"Sorry Go 'Round"	16 August 2006 (Finland)	7	Carnival of Rust
2006	"Locking Up the Sun"	29 November 2006 (Finland)	3	Carnival of Rust
2008	"The Ultimate Fling"	6 February 2008 (Finland)	2	Revolution Roulette
2008	"Diamonds for Tears"	21 May 2008 (Finland)	13	Revolution Roulette
2010	"Dreaming Wide Awake"	3 February 2010 (Finland)	18	Twilight Theater
2011	"Can You Hear Me"	2 February 2011 (Download)	—	Alchemy Vol.1
2012	"Cradled in Love"	25 January 2012 (Download)	16	Temple of Thought
2012	"Balance Slays the Demon" (as Old Gods of Asgard)	22 February 2012 (Download)	16	Non-album single^{[D]}
2012	"Kamikaze Love"	13 April 2012 (Germany)	—	Temple of Thought
2012	"The Lie Eternal"	3 July 2012 (Germany)	—	Temple of Thought
2014	"Daze"	22 August 2014 (Download)	—	Jealous Gods
2015	"Love Will Come to You"	22 January 2015 (Download)	—	Jealous Gods
2015	"Choice Millionaire"	17 August 2015 (Download)	—	Jealous Gods
2016	"Drama for Life"	5 August 2016 (Download)	—	Clearview
2018	"False Kings"	31 January 2018 (Download)	—	Ultraviolet
2018	"Dancing on Broken Glass"	7 September 2018 (Download)	—	Ultraviolet
2019	"Take Control" (as Old Gods of Asgard)	27 August 2019	—	Control: Original Game Soundtrack
2021	"Stay Forever"	15 March 2021	—	Non-album single
2022	"Requiem for My Harlequin"	1 April 2022 (Download)	—	Ghostlight
2023	"Herald of Darkness" (as Old Gods of Asgard)	14 November 2023	—	Rebirth – Greatest Hits
2026	"Black Waters"	17 April 2026	—	Non-album single

Notes

- DLater included on the EP Memory Thought Balance Ruin and the compilation album Rebirth - Greatest Hits

== Cover songs ==
Song	Original artist	Featured on	Ref
"Tobacco Road"	Dingo	Melkein vieraissa – Nimemme on Dingo	
"You Know My Name"	Chris Cornell	Livenä Vieraissa	
"Rolling in the Deep"	Adele	Nova Stage	

== Writing credits ==
Song	Performed by	Album	Ref
"Kaipaus Nousee Siivilleen"	Martti Saarinen	Martti Saarinen	
"Until Silence"	Tarja	Colours in the Dark	
"Salaisuuksia"	Johanna Kurkela	Kauriinsilmät	

== Videography ==
=== Music videos ===
Year	Video	Director(s)
2005	"Late Goodbye"	Alan Smithee
2005	"Lift"	Tuomas Harju
2006	"Carnival of Rust"	Tuomas Harju
2006	"Locking Up the Sun"	Tuomas Harju
2008	"The Ultimate Fling"	Sami Mäkelä, Jussi Rautaniemi, Minni Wiitala
2008	"Diamonds For Tears"	Niina Miettinen
2009	"Carnival of Rust" (Special Edition HD Remaster)	Tuomas Harju
2010	"Dreaming Wide Awake"	Oskari Sipola
2010	"War"	Aleksi Koskinen, Akseli Tuomivaara
2011	"Can You Hear Me"	Mikko Harma
2012	"Balance Slays the Demon"	Remedy Entertainment
2012	"Cradled in Love"	Santeri Enstedt, Mikko Harma
2014	"Daze"	Saku-Petteri Perintö
2015	"Love Will Come to You"	Saku-Petteri Perintö
2015	"Choice Millionaire"	Saku-Petteri Perintö
2016	"Drama for Life"	Saku-Petteri Perintö
2017	"Children of the Sun"	Saku-Petteri Perintö
2017	"Moonlight Kissed"	Miika Hakala
2018	"False Kings"	Miika Hakala
2018	"Dancing on Broken Glass"	Miika Hakala
2019	"The Sweet Escape" / "Partir Avec Moi"	Miika Hakala
2019	"My Dark Disquiet"	Miika Hakala
2021	"Stay Forever"	Miika Hakala
2022	"Requiem for My Harlequin"	Miika Hakala
2023	"Herald of Darkness" (as Old Gods of Asgard)	Anssi Määttä

=== Live albums ===
Year	Title	Release date
2013	Live in Moscow	14 September 2013
