= Marko Saaresto =

Finnish singer

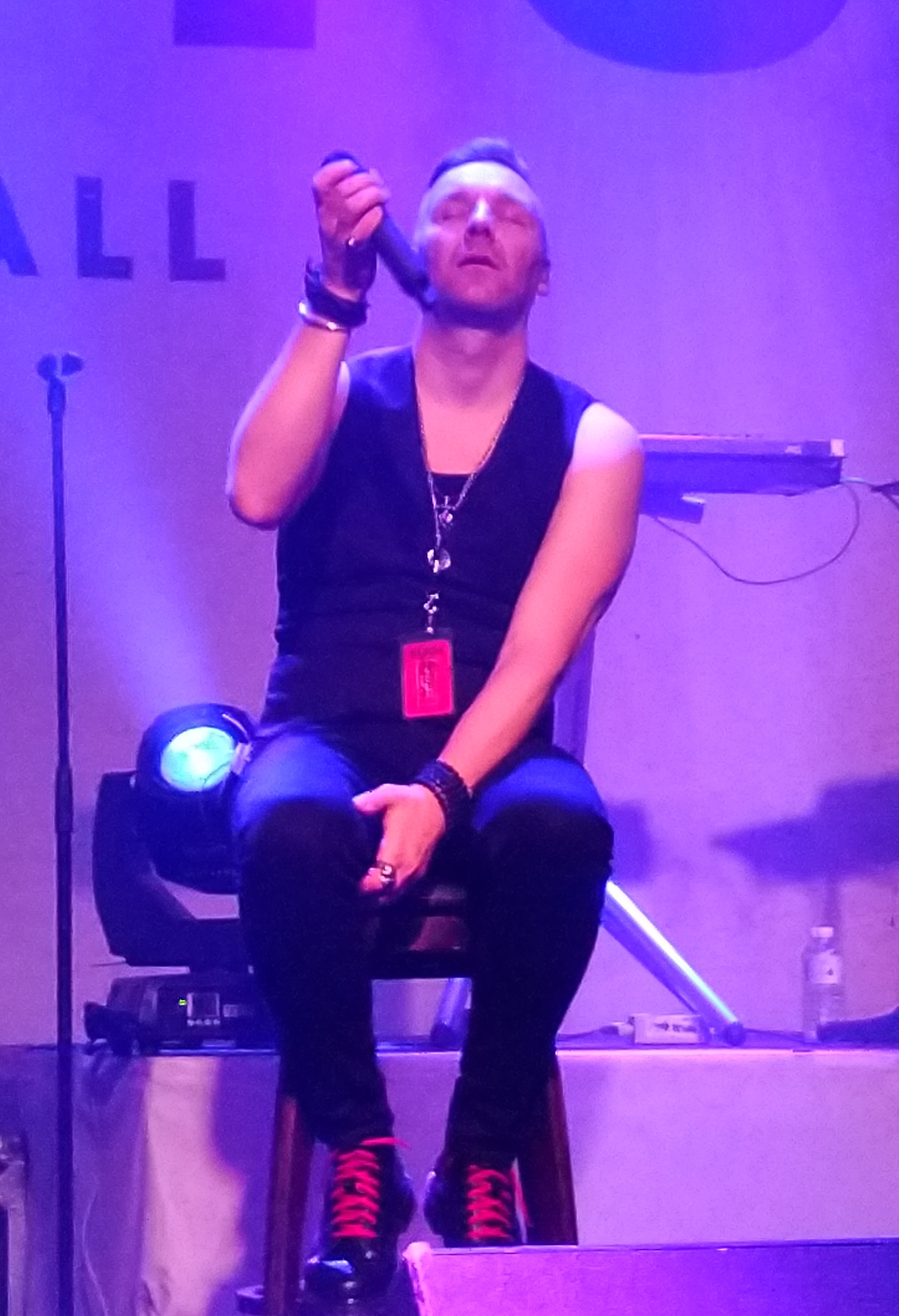
- Saaresto performing with Poets of the Fall in Krasnodar in 2019

Background information
- Also known as: Mark
- Born: 5 December 1970 (age 55); Helsinki, Finland
- Genres: Alternative rock; post-grunge; pop
- Occupations: Singer, songwriter
- Years active: 2001–present
- Member of: Poets of the Fall
- Website: poetsofthefall.com

Marko Saaresto (born 5 December 1970) is a Finnish musician. He is the lead vocalist, primary songwriter and one of the founding members of the alternative rock band Poets of the Fall.

== Early life ==
Saaresto was born in Helsinki. He was actively involved in music from a very young age and wrote several of his songs as a teenager. "Change", from the band's fourth number-one album Twilight Theater, was written by Saaresto in 1990. "Maybe Tomorrow is a Better Day" from Carnival of Rust is even older, dating back to 1988. Saaresto took up a course in graphic design and worked as a graphic designer until he was in his early thirties. Saaresto has a bass-baritone vocal range.

== Career ==
Saaresto formed a band called Playground in 2001 and wrote several songs with them. The songs were compiled into an album but they were unable to find a label to distribute it, and hence called it quits. Playground's primary members were Saaresto and Pohjoinen Syke jazz guitarist Olli Tukianen.

In early 2002, Saaresto was approached by Sam Lake, the writer of the Max Payne series of video games, to write the lead single for the second installment in the series, Max Payne 2: The Fall of Max Payne. Saaresto agreed. Lake gave Saaresto a poem he had written and asked him to make a song out of it. Saaresto modified it, and along with former Playground bandmate Tukiainen, wrote the now-famous single "Late Goodbye". To assist them with production, Lake offered them the services of industrial musician Markus "Captain" Kaarlonen. Together, they recorded the song, and upon the release of the game, it garnered cult status. Thousands of requests were made by players all around the world to own a physical copy of the song. They then decided to formally create the band and named it Poets of the Fall.

== Discography ==
=== With Poets of the Fall ===
- Signs of Life (2005)
- Carnival of Rust (2006)
- Revolution Roulette (2008)
- Twilight Theater (2010)
- Temple of Thought (2012)
- Jealous Gods (2014)
- Clearview (2016)
- Ultraviolet (2018)
- Ghostlight (2022)
- Rebirth – Greatest Hits (as Old Gods of Asgard, 2023)

=== With Playground ===
- Playground (unreleased, 2001)

=== As a featured artist ===
Year	Song	Artist	Album
1999	"Millennium Of Insight"	Lauri Järvilehto	Twilight Cinema
2008	"I Saved the World Today"	Various Artists	Non-album single for Plan International Finland charity
2009	"Lucky Star"	Phoenix Effect	Cyanide Skies
2009	"King See No Evil"	Phoenix Effect	Cyanide Skies
2009	"Taking a Vacation from Me"	Bright Lightning	Taking a Vacation from Me
2017	"Striven"	Jay Ray	Self-Resonance
2017	"Feliz Navidad"	Tarja	From Spirits and Ghosts (Score for a Dark Christmas)
2022	"Upside Down"	Larry Sandman	More Than Free

Audiobooks

- Words into Worlds by Flamelight (2021)
