= Alchemy Vol. 1 =

Compilation album by Poets of the Fall
- Released: 16 March 2011
- Genre: Alternative rock
- Length: 69:13
- Label: Insomniac
- Producer: Poets of the Fall

Poets of the Fall chronology
Twilight Theater (2010)	Alchemy Vol. 1 (2011)	Temple of Thought (2012)

Singles from Alchemy Vol. 1
- 1. "Can You Hear Me" Released: 2 February 2011

Professional ratings
Review scores
Source	Rating
Venia-mag.net	(90/100)

Alchemy Vol. 1 is the first international compilation album by the Finnish rock band Poets of the Fall. It was released in Finland as well as on iTunes on 16 March 2011. The record includes five tracks from Signs of Life, three tracks from Carnival of Rust, two tracks from Revolution Roulette, three tracks from Twilight Theater, and two original compositions.

== Track listing ==
=== CD ===
All tracks are written by Poets of the Fall.

No.	Title	Album	Length
1.	"Can You Hear Me"	Previously unreleased	4:15
2.	"Late Goodbye"	Signs of Life	3:46
3.	"Lift"	Signs of Life	5:12
4.	"Illusion & Dream"	Signs of Life	5:14
5.	"Stay"	Signs of Life	3:34
6.	"Sleep"	Signs of Life	4:56
7.	"Carnival of Rust"	Carnival of Rust	4:19
8.	"Locking Up the Sun"	Carnival of Rust	3:54
9.	"Roses"	Carnival of Rust	4:01
10.	"The Ultimate Fling"	Revolution Roulette	6:52
11.	"Diamonds for Tears"	Revolution Roulette	4:12
12.	"Dreaming Wide Awake"	Twilight Theater	4:24
13.	"War"	Twilight Theater	5:03
14.	"Given and Denied"	Twilight Theater	4:16
15.	"No End, No Beginning"	Previously unreleased	5:15
Total length:			69:13

=== DVD ===
1. "Late Goodbye"
2. "Lift"
3. "Carnival of Rust" (original)
4. "Carnival of Rust" (remastered)
5. "Locking Up the Sun"
6. "The Ultimate Fling"
7. "Diamonds for Tears"
8. "Dreaming Wide Awake"
9. "War"

== Release history ==
Country	Release date
Finland	16 March 2011
iTunes Worldwide	16 March 2011

== Singles ==
Single	Release date	Charts
Can You Hear Me	2 February 2011 (Download)	

== Release ==
The physical release of the album has the option to come with a T-shirt, or a flag.
