= Ghostlight (album) =

Studio album by Poets of the Fall
- Released: 29 April 2022
- Recorded: Poets HQ
- Length: 55:32
- Label: Insomniac
- Producer: Poets of the Fall

Poets of the Fall chronology
Ultraviolet (2018)	Ghostlight (2022)

Singles from Ghostlight
- 1. "Requiem for My Harlequin" Released: 1 April 2022

Ghostlight is the ninth studio album by Finnish alternative rock band Poets of the Fall, released on 29 April 2022, through Insomniac. As stated in interviews, the album serves as a closing part of a trilogy, with the first two parts being Clearview (2016) and Ultraviolet (2018). After more pop-oriented and synth-driven Ultraviolet, Ghostlight shows the band returning to guitar-led, symphonic orchestrations. It is the longest album in Poets' discography.

== Reception ==
The album was met with mixed response. Andrea Crow from Tuonela Magazine stated that Ghostlight "sees the band at the peak of creativity and artistry, as their trademark blend of rock, pop, and cinematic orchestrations has reached a new level of perfection and beauty". On Sputnikmusic, the album got 2.5 out of 5 with the reviewer hoping for the band "to step away from the flirting with the 1980s sound that overshadowed everything [on Ultraviolet] and give us something a bit livelier".

== Track listing ==
All tracks are written by Poets of the Fall

Ghostlight track listing
No.	Title	Length
1.	"Firedancer"	6:20
2.	"Requiem for My Harlequin"	5:37
3.	"Sounds of Yesterday"	5:23
4.	"Revelations"	6:03
5.	"Heroes and Villains"	5:10
6.	"Lust for Life"	4:26
7.	"Chasing Echoes"	4:18
8.	"Weaver of Dreams"	5:55
9.	"Hello Cabaret"	5:47
10.	"Beyond the Horizon"	6:28

== Notes ==
- The track "Heroes and Villains", was featured in the 2023 Remedy Entertainment video game Alan Wake 2.

== Personnel ==
- Marko Saaresto – vocals
- Olli Tukiainen – lead guitar
- Jaska Mäkinen – rhythm guitar
- Markus "Captain" Kaarlonen – keyboards, production
- Jani Snellman – bass
- Jari Salminen – drums, percussion

== Charts ==
Chart performance for Ghostlight
Chart (2022)	Peak position
Finnish Albums (Suomen virallinen lista)	2
