= Markus Kaarlonen =

Finnish musician and composer

- Also known as: Captain
- Born: 16 November 1973 (age 52)
- Genres: Alternative rock; electropop; techno
- Occupation: Musician
- Instrument: Keyboard
- Years active: 1990–present
- Labels: Insomniac, Playground

Markus "Captain" Kaarlonen (born 16 November 1973) is a Finnish musician, songwriter, producer, and the keyboardist of the Dance Nation band/rock band Poets of the Fall. Kaarlonen first became known in the underground with his Amiga MOD music in the early 1990s. His first commercial album was released as Dance Nation's album Dawn in 1994. After that he worked as producer for pop group Aikakone.

Kaarlonen also worked for the software company Futuremark as a Senior Web Developer and Audio Designer. He has also composed and/or produced music for video games, including Rochard, Max Payne 2, Alan Wake, and Shattered Horizon.

== Discography ==
=== Mod era ===
- Spacemuzaxx (Mod Archive link: https://modarchive.org/index.php?request=view_by_moduleid&query=86949)
- Space Debris (Horizon Party 1990, Vårby school, Stockholm, Sweden) (Mod Archive link: https://modarchive.org/index.php?request=view_by_moduleid&query=57925)
- Beyond Music (The Gathering 1991, Parikkala, Finland) (Mod Archive link: https://modarchive.org/index.php?request=view_by_moduleid&query=214414)
- Broken Dreams (Assembly 1993) (Mod Archive link: https://modarchive.org/index.php?request=view_by_moduleid&query=38877)
- Mickus (Assembly 1994) (Mod Archive link: https://modarchive.org/index.php?request=view_by_moduleid&query=51511)

=== Commercial productions ===
- Dance Nation: Dawn (1994)
- Poets of the Fall: Signs of Life (2005)
- Poets of the Fall: Carnival of Rust (2006)
- Poets of the Fall: Revolution Roulette (2008)
- Shattered Horizon Original Soundtrack (2009)
- Poets of the Fall: Twilight Theater (2010)
- Rochard: Original Soundtrack (2011)
- Poets of the Fall: Temple of Thought (2012)
- Poets of the Fall: Jealous Gods (2014)
- Poets of the Fall: Clearview (2016)
- Poets of the Fall: Ultraviolet (2018)
