= Cirrus (Helsinki building) =

Apartment building in Helsinki, Finland

Coordinates: 60.20620°N 25.14571°E

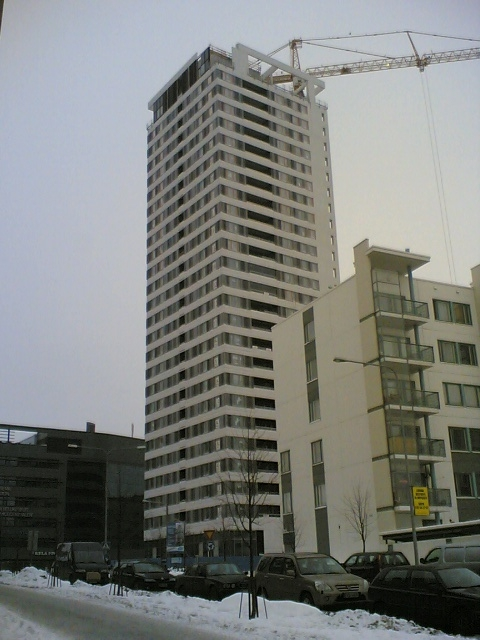
The Cirrus building reached its peak height in March 2006.

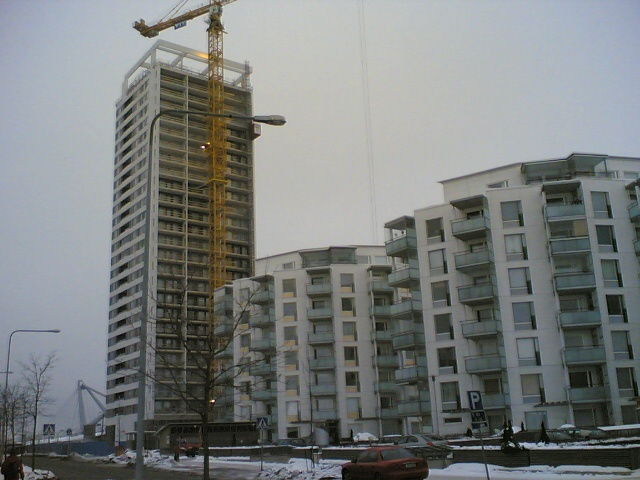
The high-rise is located in central Vuosaari.

Cirrus is a high-rise cooperative apartment building in Helsinki, the capital of Finland. Cirrus is the eighth tallest building in Finland with a height of 86 meters (282 feet). The building, which is located in Vuosaari in East Helsinki, has 26 floors (including two underground ones) and 140 apartments. The proposal for this building originally included a public observation terrace and cafe, but they were never built.

The building was designed by the Finnish architect company YIT Group and construction commenced in early 2005. The building reached its final height on 15 March 2006.

The roof was part of the setting of the music video of Finnish rock band Poets of the Fall's 2010 single Dreaming Wide Awake.

== See also ==
- List of tallest buildings in Finland
