= List of Quantum Break episodes =

Quantum Break is an action-adventure third-person shooter video game developed by Remedy Entertainment and published by Microsoft Studios, released for Microsoft Windows and Xbox One. The game features digital episodes that interact with the game based on the player's choices which, not unlike previous Remedy Entertainment entry Alan Wake with its Bright Falls mini-series, tie into the main plot and expand the game's universe.

The four episodes run concurrently with the game, interleaved between the game's five acts. The episodes are impacted in varying degrees by antagonist Paul Serene's actions, and to a lesser extent by protagonist Jack Joyce's involvement in the environment (such as stealing a company gala invite making an employee late). The episodes are not vital to understanding the plot, but simply supplement the story by providing perspectives other than that of Jack Joyce.

== Episodes ==
=== Season 1 ===
No. overall	No. in season	Title
1	1	"Monarch Solutions"
Uncomfortable with Serene's choices, Monarch employee Liam Burke confides his unhappiness with his wife Emily, before returning to a call out. Finding Beth Wilder uncuffing Jack Joyce, Burke and Wilder end up in a stand-off only for their guns to disappear; Jack disarmed them and escaped during a stutter. Approached by Monarch agents, Beth and Liam overpower them. Informed of a mysterious "Lifeboat Protocol" by Beth, Burke heads to Monarch to get access for himself and his wife. Charlie Wincott, head of Monarch surveillance, narrowly spies Burke fighting Monarch and believes him to be the traitor helping Jack. Moving to inform Hatch, he is approached by an oblivious Burke. Charlie, secretly alerting security, watches as Liam flees and is pursued across Riverport, only to surrender when cornered.
2	2	"Prisoner"
Serene, receiving controlled chronon exposure to counter the effects of radiation exposure, is warned by Dr. Amaral that the fracture looks to be occurring sooner than expected. Dr. Amaral, confronting Hatch, presses him to convince Serene that time will end soon; Hatch shrugs off her claims, treating her with hostility before she leaves. Attending the gala together, Charlie and Fiona Miller soon go for a drunken walk, only for Burke to appear and demand access to the Lifeboat Protocol. Fiona, recognizing Burke, reveals she too is a double agent working with Beth. Breaking into a lab, the trio discovers Dr. Kim, a missing lead scientist, has turned into a hostile monster due to heavy chronon exposure and has been contained. Charlie, stealing a stutter backpack, escapes from Liam and Fiona when Monarch is alerted during a stutter. If Serene chose "Personal", he tells Jack that he has found that fighting is futile due to causal loops, so he is simply preparing for time's end rather than trying to fix the fracture, and deems Will and other casualties as necessary sacrifices. If Serene gives his speech, Hatch briefly chats with Jack before giving him the handcuff keys and leaves him unattended.
3	3	"Deception"
Hatch informs Charlie of the Lifeboat Protocol: it is an underground, stutter-proof sanctuary where essential and higher Monarch staff can continue research on fixing the fracture when time stops permanently. Believing Serene is unhinged, Hatch plots to overthrow him and take control of Monarch, and offers Charlie a Lifeboat position provided he helps him take the CFR powering it. Heading to the lab, Hatch releases Dr. Kim into the Monarch HQ by detonating the lab. Liam and Fiona, catching up to Charlie, threaten him and demand answers. Offering Lifeboat positions but secretly calling Hatch, Charlie leads them through a service tunnel only for Liam to be suddenly shot by a Monarch gunman. Allowing Charlie and Fiona to leave, the gunman boasts that he looks forward to killing Emily, only to have his throat slashed when Liam suddenly gets up. Rushing to the hospital where Emily is working, Liam finds another Monarch gunman and fights him, ending when Liam kills him. Consoling Emily, Liam explains the Lifeboat Protocol and takes her to Monarch HQ. Meeting with his science staff, Serene is told time is expected to end within eight hours. Learning all of his treatment equipment has been destroyed in the lab explosion and without Amaral, Serene realizes he doesn't have long to live. Receiving a call from the lab, Serene learns that a surviving soldier is implicating Hatch for the explosion; Serene demands his immediate arrest.
4	4	"The Lifeboat Protocol"
Charlie hacks the Monarch system and learns the Lifeboat is the lowest basement, before granting access to himself and Fiona. Fiona is contacted by Jack, who asks for her help infiltrating Monarch HQ so he can steal the CFR. Entering the Lifeboat, Fiona apologizes to Charlie, and asks for his help getting the CFR even though it would deactivate the Lifeboat. Charlie decides to leave and hack into the CFR chamber to help Jack, leaving Fiona in the Lifeboat. Dr Amaral is recovered by Monarch and arrives at the HQ, while Hatch overpowers his guards and escapes custody. Liam, shooting his way through the Monarch HQ, intending to access the Lifeboat by force, and reaches the lobby with Emily. Depending on Serene's Act 4 choice, whether to take his final treatment or succumb to his illness and paranoia, several events are impacted: Control: Serene allows the Lifeboat to activate, and transports Amaral to the basement. Giving a rousing speech to his staff, Serene exits due to his impending death. Arriving at the lobby, Paul grants Lifeboat access to Liam and Emily on the condition that Liam will defend the CFR from Jack. Charlie hacks the CFR chamber open, only to be shot and killed by Hatch, who then attacks Liam as he seeks to sabotage it outright; a struggle ensues, which culminates in Liam stabbing Hatch through the eye and killing him. However, as Liam choose to return to the side of Paul and protect the CFR chamber, he is later killed by Jack Joyce. Surrender: Serene attempts to stop the Lifeboat's automatic activation and fails, as it was programmed with a failsafe by Amaral; Serene murders her with a metal paperweight in retaliation. Giving a hateful speech by monitor, Serene labels all his Lifeboat staff traitors. Arriving at the lobby, Charlie bumps into Liam and Emily, and they all head to CFR to secure it. Charlie hacks the CFR chamber open, only for Liam to be fatally shot and killed by Hatch. Hatch enters the chamber but Charlie activates the defences, seemingly killing him; Hatch suddenly reappears alive and attacks him, but Emily shoots Hatch several times, killing him. Unable to deactivate the defences, Charlie gives Emily Lifeboat access and stays behind to assist Jack.
