= Matthew Porretta =

American actor

- Born: Darien, Connecticut, U.S.
- Occupation: Actor
- Years active: 1993–present
- Spouse: Gleice (m. 2012–2014)
- Children: 2

Matthew Porretta is an American television, voice, and film actor known for his appearances in Wings, Beverly Hills, 90210, and Robin Hood: Men in Tights. He has also appeared on Broadway and in video games, where he is known for his voice role as the titular character in Remedy Entertainment's videogames Alan Wake, its sequel Alan Wake 2, as Alan Wake in Quantum Break, and live action as Dr. Casper Darling in Control and Control Resonant.

== Life and career ==
Porretta was born in Darien, Connecticut, into a show-biz family: His father, Frank Porretta, was a famous tenor, opera singer and musical theater actor. His mother, Roberta Palmer Porretta, former Miss Ohio 1956, was a spinto soprano. She returned to school after raising their children and went on to an international opera career after graduating from the Juilliard School of Music.

By the age of 25, Matthew Porretta was already a veteran of Broadway and a student at the Manhattan School of Music. In 1990 he broke into television with recurring roles on shows like Wings and Beverly Hills, 90210. His first major movie role came in 1993 when he portrayed Will Scarlet O'Hara in Mel Brooks' spoof Robin Hood: Men in Tights. Four years later, Porretta starred as Robin Hood in the first two seasons of The New Adventures of Robin Hood. Since 1997, he has been starring in independent movies, commercials and TV shows.

His debut role on stage was Marius Pontmercy during the national tour of Les Misérables, between 1989 and 1994. In 1994, he was part of the original Broadway cast of Stephen Sondheim's Passion. Despite not performing in the movie, filmed shortly after the Broadway Production ended, Porretta reprised his role as Count Ludovic for Passion - Original Broadway Cast Recording, which won the Best Musical Theater Album at 37th Annual Grammy Awards.

Since 2010, Porretta has been doing the voice acting for the titular character of the psychological action thriller video game franchise Alan Wake by Remedy Entertainment. He returned in 2012 for Alan Wake's American Nightmare and in 2023 for Alan Wake II as well as for a DLC Chapter from Dead by Daylight, released in 2024. He also portrayed Dr. Casper Darling in Remedy's Control and Marco Graziani in Starfield.

== Personal life ==
Porretta has four siblings. The eldest, Frank Porretta III, is a successful opera singer. His other brother, Greg, has a diverse artistic background across multiple disciplines and has guest-starred with Matthew on television. His sisters, Anna and Roberta, are also in the entertainment industry; Anna was a writer for Talk Soup.

Porretta has two sons with ex-wife Gleice; Luigi (born May 22, 2001) and Enzo (born April 13, 2008). The children were born while Porretta and Gleice were in a relationship. The couple eventually married in 2012 and divorced in 2014. Porretta is still living in Darien with his sons.

In December 2016, he was involved in a bar fight in which a customer hit the actor with a beer mug after Porretta, intoxicated after a couple of drinks, walked in the man's direction and stumbled towards him. The attack not only resulted in cuts to his left eye and cheek but also a facial fracture and injuries to his spine and nasal septum. Porretta needed emergency surgery to save his left eye, and still has vision issues as a result of the attack. In March 2017, Porretta filed a lawsuit against the bar owner and alleged attacker. The lawsuit moved forward in June 2019, and in 2023 the man accepted an offer from state prosecutors and pleaded guilty to second-degree assault. Under the state's offer, he received a jail sentence of five years, suspended after serving between six and 18 months. He is expected to receive up to five years of probation.

== Filmography ==
=== Television ===
Year	Project	Role	Episode	Notes
1993	Beverly Hills, 90210	Dan Rubin	10 episodes	
1993	Class of '96	Claude	Episode: "Breaking up Is Hard to Overdue"	
1993	South Beach	Richard	Episode: "Wild Thing"	
1996	Wings	David Barnes	Episode: "Love at First Flight"	
1996–1998	The New Adventures of Robin Hood	Robin Hood	23 episodes	
2000	Code Name: Eternity	Leethan	Episode: "Death Trap"	
2004	Without a Trace	Oscar	Episode: "Doppelgänger"	
2005	CSI: NY	Ron Bogda	Episode: "Hush"	
2010	Imagination Movers	Stanley Spillburger	Episode: "Seeing Stars"	
2010	Bright Falls	Alan Wake	Episode: "Clearcut"	
2011	Blue Bloods	Congressman Albom	Episode: "Lonely Hearts Club"	
2014	Unforgettable	Bruce Miller	Episode: "The Island"	
2014	The Good Wife	Ian Gatins	Episode: "Sticky Content"	
2015	Deadbeat	Crosby / Matthew Biscotti	5 episodes	
2015-2016	I Love You... But I Lied	David	2 episodes	
2019	The Blacklist	Schmock	Episode: "General Shiro"	

=== Film ===
Year	Project	Role	Notes
1993	Robin Hood: Men in Tights	Will Scarlet O'Hara	
1995	Dracula: Dead and Loving It	Handsome Lieutenant at Ball	
1999	Desperate But Not Serious	Gene	
1999	Kate's Addiction	Dylan Parker	
1999	Turkey. Cake.	Jimmy	
2003	Dream Warrior	Caleb	
2016	Wolves	Coach Williams	

=== Video games ===
Year	Project	Role	Notes
2010	Alan Wake	Alan Wake (voice)	
2012	Alan Wake's American Nightmare	Alan Wake, Mr. Scratch (voice)	
2013	Grand Theft Auto V	The local population	
2013	The Bureau: XCOM Declassified	Additional voices	
2016	Quantum Break	Alan Wake (voice)	
2019	Red Dead Online	The local pedestrian population	
2019	Control	Dr. Casper Darling (live acting and voice), Alan Wake (voice)	
2023	Starfield	Marco Graziani / Mooch (voice)	
2023	Alan Wake II	Alan Wake, Mr. Scratch (voice), Dr. Casper Darling (live acting and voice)	
2024	Dead by Daylight	Alan Wake	
2026	Control Resonant	Dr. Casper Darling (live acting and voice)	
2026	Grand Theft Auto VI	The Local Population	

== Awards and nominations ==
Year	Award	Category	Work	Result	Ref.
2013	NAVGTR Awards	Lead Performance in a Drama (Alan Wake)	Alan Wake's American Nightmare	Nominated	
2013	NAVGTR Awards	Supporting Performance in a Drama (Mr. Scratch)	Alan Wake's American Nightmare	Nominated	
2019	The Game Awards	Best Performance (Dr. Casper Darling)	Control	Nominated	
2023	Golden Joystick Awards	Best Lead Performer (Alan Wake)	Alan Wake 2	Nominated	
2024	British Academy Games Awards	Performer in a Leading Role	Alan Wake 2	Longlisted	
2024	Arab Game Awards	Outstanding Performance (alongside Ilkka Villi)	Alan Wake 2	Won	
