= Phoenix Effect =

Finnish rock band

- Origin: Espoo, Finland
- Genres: Alternative rock, Post-grunge, Rock
- Years active: 2008–present
- Label: Insomniac
- Members: Janne Kärkkäinen; Pyry Nikkilä; Lauri Hämäläinen; Anton Laurila
- Website: www.phoenixeffect.com

Phoenix Effect is an alternative rock/post-grunge band from Espoo, Finland. Formed in 2008 by guitarist and vocalist Janne Kärkkäinen, the band has released two studio albums. Their first album, Cyanide Skies, was released on 18 February 2009 in Finland and entered the Finnish album charts at No. 22. Phoenix Effect have been known to collaborate with leading Finnish alternative rock band Poets of the Fall. Marko Saaresto and Olli Tukiainen from Poets of the Fall have performed additional vocals/guitars for the album. They have also made a cameo appearance in Phoenix Effect's music video 'King See No Evil'.

In addition to Kärkkäinen, the band consists of Pyry Nikkilä (guitar), Lauri Hämäläinen (bass) and Anton Laurila (drums).

== History ==
=== Early years (2007–08) ===
Lead vocalist Janne Kärkkäinen was a former member of the Finnish pop band Sunrise Avenue. Kärkkäinen parted ways with the band in 2007, citing a need to explore his own musical tastes. It was not very long, however, before he decided to set up Phoenix Effect. Kärkkäinen had a lot of ideas for songs, but he had given up songwriting years ago, at the start of Sunrise Avenue. The idea of calling up the guys from Poets Of The Fall, a rock group Kärkkäinen had toured with in his Sunrise Avenue days, arose and Saaresto and Tukiainen wrote several of the songs of their debut album, Cyanide Skies.

During the spring of 2008 the band members held songwriting sessions and as a result of every session there was a new song. Kärkkäinen recorded demos of the songs, and in May 2008 he and the guys sat down to go through the material created. The feeling was mutual and clear; these songs should be on an album. This would eventually lead to the creation of their album, Cyanide Skies.

=== Cyanide Skies (2009) ===
The debut album "Cyanide Skies" was recorded during the fall of 2008 and was released on 18 February 2009. The album contained ten tracks of rock. In addition to the band members, featured on the album were Poets of the Fall's Jari Salminen(drums) and Jani Snellman (bass). Marko Saaresto and Olli Tukiainen also performed on a couple of tracks. The album was produced by Markus Kaarlonen, keyboardist and producer of Poets of the Fall as well as Kärkkäinen and it was released under Poets of the Fall's Insomniac label in Finland.

Cyanide Skies debuted at #22 on the Finnish charts. The album received positive reviews from critics.

== Discography ==
=== Studio albums ===
| Year | Album | Release | Chart |
|---|---|---|---|
| 2009 | Cyanide Skies | 18 February 2009 (Finland) | 22 (Finland) |
| 2010 | Phoenix Effect | 13 October 2010 (Finland) | |

=== Singles ===
| Year | Single |
|---|---|
| 2008 | Broken Promises |
| 2009 | King See No Evil |
| 2009 | Carry Me |
| 2009 | Magic |
| 2010 | Euphoria |
| 2010 | A Light to Guide |
| 2022 | The Edge of Surrender |

=== Videography ===
| Year | Video | Director |
|---|---|---|
| 2008 | Broken Promises | Oskari Sipola |
