= Rochard =

2011 video game

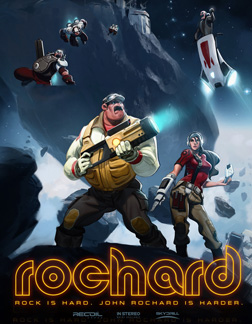
- Cover art for Rochard
- Developer: Recoil Games
- Publishers: Sony Online Entertainment (PS3), Recoil Games (Windows, Mac, Linux)
- Director: Burt Kane
- Producer: Kalle Kaivola
- Composer: Markus Kaarlonen
- Engine: Unity
- Platforms: PlayStation 3, Microsoft Windows, Mac OS X, Linux, Android
- Release: PlayStation 3: NA: September 27, 2011; EU: September 28, 2011; Microsoft Windows: WW: November 15, 2011; Mac OS X: WW: December 21, 2011; Linux: WW: September 18, 2012; Android: WW: March 9, 2014
- Genre: Platformer
- Mode: Single-player

Rochard is a science fiction platform game available for the PlayStation 3 through the PlayStation Network, for Android, Microsoft Windows, Linux and Mac OS X through the Steam online distribution platform, and for Linux as part of the Humble Indie Bundle 6. Developed by Recoil Games, the game revolves around the manipulation of gravity and the use of a gravity device used to easily move heavy objects around.

The game was launched on the PlayStation Network on September 27, 2011, in USA and on September 28, 2011, in Europe. The game was launched for Windows on November 15, 2011. The game was launched worldwide for Android on March 9, 2014. The game was made unavailable to purchase from Steam on February 17, 2021.

== Gameplay ==
Rochard is a two-dimensional side-scrolling platformer taking place in three-dimensional scenes. The player character, John Rochard, works his way through a series of environments, each containing a mix of puzzle and combat encounters. To overcome these challenges, the player has access to several tools and mechanics that relate to gravity, weight and matter properties.

Players can change the gravity between “normal” earthlike gravity and low gravity. Controlling the gravity is the key feature of the game and allows John to, for example, jump higher in low gravity, alter trajectories of thrown objects, or swing on certain objects using the Gravity Beam. Some levels have sections where the gravity is inverted. In some other levels, players can invert the gravity themselves.

The player is equipped with the "G-Lifter", a modular mining tool hosting various subsystems like a remote gravity controller, a flashlight, and a communication device. When the gravity beam mode is selected it allows John to grab and shoot or drop certain objects like crates, explosives containers etc. With the gravity beam John can also manipulate and move certain objects, like big mining lasers, cargo containers etc. After an upgrade the G-Beam is powerful enough to lift John in low G allowing him to dangle and swing from certain objects. All objects which can be manipulated with the gravity beam are highlighted with a white swipe effect on the surface. The player gets to upgrade the gravity beam several times to gain new abilities to it. In addition to the G-Swing the player can use the G-Beam as a weapon against flying droids, automated turrets and even human enemies (respectively).

Force fields block certain objects. There are four types of force fields: Bio force field (red, blocks human characters); Matter force field (blue, blocks inanimate objects); Energy force field (orange, blocks weapon fire and explosions); Omni force field (white, blocks everything).

Fuses are used to control power on certain electrically powered items. The controlled item is attached to a fuse socket with a thick visible cable. The player can control the power on the item by attaching or detaching the fuse to/from the socket. The fuses cannot be physically damaged but they can be disabled temporarily by shooting at them or using explosives on them.

== Plot ==
John Rochard (Jon St. John), leader of the lowest producing team of astro-miners the Skyrig Corporation ever employed, accidentally discovers an ancient structure hidden deep in an asteroid. Soon afterwards, John’s team goes missing without a trace and he finds himself stranded on the asteroid and under attack by space bandits. John quickly realizes that dangerous forces are at work, determined to use the discovery for their own sinister means.

As the supposed reinforcements of his boss Maximillian arrive, it is revealed that they are in league with the space bandits. Fighting his way down through the tunnels to get to his trapped team mates Skyler (Lani Minella) and Zander. As John reaches them, Zander succumbs to his wounds, sending both Skyler and John on a path to uncover the mystery surrounding their recent find and to avenge their fallen colleague. The ancient structure turns out to be an alien temple, containing Native American glyphs. Unable to read the engravings, John and Skyler decide to head for Floyd, Skyler's uncle, whose Native American roots might help them make sense of it all.

Upon arriving on the seemingly deserted asteroid-based casino, John heads to Floyd’s office. It turns out the space bandits have taken over the casino and John has to fight his way to the office which is found vacant. Skyler suggests John to head to the money vault, where Floyd might have barricaded himself. Upon finding Floyd, John is told about an ancient legend of Native American Indians and the Katsina statues that grant its user divine powers. It is revealed that he has to get a decoder disc from his boss’s office, located in the Skyrig headquarters, to be able to find the real Katsina temple. John fights his way to meet Skyler in an abandoned hangar, from where they take off to the Skyrig headquarters.

John infiltrates the headquarters using ventilation shafts and other back doors, avoiding security cameras while sneaking his way towards his boss’ office. Once his presence is noticed, he has to fight his way to the office, where he finds the decoder ring that can be used to decipher the strange writings at the alien temple. John escapes the office and battles his way past sky police and their combat droids to reach a secluded cargo hangar. Skyler picks up John and they head back to the mining asteroid.

The pirates have trashed the place so John decides to take an alternate route to the alien temple. After fighting an army of droids and turrets, John has to use a huge mining laser to get into the alien temple. At the temple he finds out that the decoder ring is actually a power source, which makes the strange markings on the walls glow. A large star map is revealed pointing to the Casino Asteroid they visited earlier. Sky police have found John and Skyler and they get separated. John has to find an alternative way to the hangar. When John gets there he finds Skyler captured by the space police and his ship being blown up. He decides to use an old race bird “Switchblade” to pursue the sky police and Skyler to the casino.

John enters the abandoned part of the casino asteroid, which is an old Skyrig mine. On his way to the second alien temple he finds an old "Helga" G-Lifter, which has old hazardous features still active: it's able to grab human characters and shoots anti-gravity charges which lift objects they attach to. He fights his way to the Katsina temple and finds his boss holding the Katsina statue there. In the ensuing fight, John comes very close to Maximillian. When he is about to defeat his boss, a giant vortex appears devouring first Maximillian, followed by Skyler and John. They are all sucked into another dimension, leaving only an ominously glowing "Helga" G-Lifter behind.

== Development ==
Rochard has been developed using the Unity engine and was launched in late September 2011 as the first PlayStation 3 game to use this engine. Unity's multi-platform capabilities also resulted in a speedy follow-up release on Steam on November 15, 2011. The Mac version followed in December 2011 on Mac App Store, and the Linux version was available in Humble Indie Bundle 6 on September 18, 2012.

The game features a soundtrack composed by Markus “Captain” Kaarlonen from Poets of the Fall, mixing southern rock/blues and 1980s-inspired electronic music, originally composed on Amiga with Protracker. A special version of the game that includes the full soundtrack in an MP3 format was released on Steam alongside the game's regular edition.

== Expansion ==
An expansion pack for the game entitled Rochard: Hard Times was released in March 2013. The downloadable content features four new, extra challenging puzzle levels. The expansion has an emphasis on puzzle-solving as opposed to combat, and the levels were created to be challenging for even the most experienced players. The expansion is, however, not integrated into the story told by the original game.

== Reception ==
Reception

Aggregate scores
Aggregator	Score
GameRankings	PS3: 79%); PC: 82%
Metacritic	PS3: 79% PC: 81%

Review scores
Publication	Score
GamePro	9/10
GameSpot	7.0/10
GameTrailers	7.1/10
IGN	8.5/10
Joystiq	4/5

Awards
Publication	Award
IGN	2011 Editors Choice
GameShark	2011 Editors Choice
GamePro	2011 Editors Choice
GamingXP	2011 Best of Gamescom
Unity	Best Graphics - 2011
Unity	Best Gameplay - 2011
Pelit	Editors' Pick

Rochard has received generally favorable reviews for its initial release on PSN, with a Metacritic average score of 79% and a GameRankings average score of 79%. The following Steam release was well received for its solid conversion of the control mechanics to a keyboard and mouse format, standing at a Metacritic average of 82% and a GameRankings average of 82.5%.

Prior to its release, Rochard was awarded "Best of Gamescom 2011" by GamingXP. Following its release, the game has received Editors' Choice awards from IGN, GamePro, Gaming Nexus, GameShark and Pelit and won the Unity Awards for Best Gameplay and Best Graphics at the Unite 2011 event.

GamingOnLinux reviewer Hamish Paul Wilson gave the game 8/10, commenting that "in the end it comes across as what it was probably always meant to be: a fun and competent physics platformer that does not take itself too seriously."
