= Ultraviolet (Poets of the Fall album) =

Studio album by Poets of the Fall
- Released: 5 October 2018
- Recorded: Poets HQ
- Genre: Alternative rock
- Length: 45:07
- Label: Insomniac
- Producer: Poets of the Fall

Poets of the Fall chronology
Clearview (2016)	Ultraviolet (2018)	Ghostlight (2022)

Singles from Ultraviolet
- 1. "False Kings" Released: 31 January 2018; 2. "Dancing on Broken Glass" Released: 7 September 2018; 3. "The Sweet Escape" Released: 10 May 2019; 4. "Partir Avec Moi (French version of "The Sweet Escape")" Released: 16 May 2019; 5. "My Dark Disquiet" Released: 27 August 2019

Professional ratings
Review scores
Source	Rating
Distorted Sound	6/10

Ultraviolet is the eighth studio album by Finnish rock band Poets of the Fall, released on 5 October 2018 through Insomniac. As stated in interviews, the album is the second part of a trilogy, the first part being their prior album. The album deals with the unseen world, the ultraviolet spectrum of light, which can, at times, be harmful. It's all that which we are not aware of, but which still affects us and influences us in our daily lives. How we perceive things and how we make choices and act based on those perceptions.

== Reception ==
Reviews from critics have been relatively positive. Though a bit of a departure from their rock sound and containing more pop elements, the album does still contain rock and also some prog elements that are comparable to the Von Hertzen Brothers, and the band was praised as such by critics. A reviewer from Maximum Volume Music applauded them for "not simply sticking to what was a winning formula and for mixing styles up", while also stating how this would be very dividing for fans from the early days, but how it will also win a few new ones.

== Track listing ==
All tracks are written by Poets of the Fall

Ultraviolet track listing
No.	Title	Length
1.	"Dancing on Broken Glass"	3:54
2.	"My Dark Disquiet"	5:10
3.	"False Kings"	3:31
4.	"Fool's Paradise"	4:33
5.	"Standstill"	3:47
6.	"The Sweet Escape"	5:30
7.	"Moments Before the Storm"	4:26
8.	"In a Perfect World"	4:46
9.	"Angel"	4:22
10.	"Choir of Cicadas"	5:04

== Notes ==
- The track "My Dark Disquiet", was featured in the 2019 Remedy Entertainment game Control.

== Personnel ==
Poets of the Fall

- Marko Saaresto – vocals
- Olli Tukiainen – lead guitar
- Jaska Mäkinen – rhythm guitar
- Markus "Captain" Kaarlonen – keyboards, production
- Jani Snellman – bass
- Jari Salminen – drums, percussion

== Charts ==
Chart performance for Ultraviolet
Chart (2018)	Peak position
Finnish Albums (Suomen virallinen lista)	1
