= Dreaming Wide Awake (song) =

Single by Poets of the Fall

from the album Twilight Theater
- Released: 3 February 2010
- Genre: Cinematic rock
- Length: 4:22 (album version); 3:46 (single version)
- Label: Insomniac
- Songwriter: Poets of the Fall
- Producer: Poets of the Fall

Poets of the Fall singles chronology
"Diamonds for Tears" (2008)	"Dreaming Wide Awake" (2010)

"Dreaming Wide Awake" is the first single from the album Twilight Theater by Poets of the Fall. The single was released in Finland on 3 February 2010 and contains two versions of the title track. It peaked at #18 in the Finnish Top 20 Singles Charts.

== Track listing ==
1. Dreaming Wide Awake (radio edit) - 3:46
2. Dreaming Wide Awake (album version) - 4:22

== Music video ==
"Dreaming Wide Awake" video was released on 10 February 2010. It was directed by Oskari Sipola. The video premiered online in HD quality on YouTube. It features actors Kai Bäckström and Jemina Sillanpää, starring as two lovers and shows the consequences of loss, as it is revealed later that the woman died and the man is not able to cope with the loss which makes him lose his grip on reality. The heavy snow environment adds to the feeling of cold and isolation. The video was shot with a Red One camera. Shots of Marko Saaresto singing were shot on the top of the Cirrus building in Helsinki, the tallest building in Finland.
