= Alan Wake =

2010 video game

- Developer: Remedy Entertainment (Note: Nitro Games co-developed the Windows port. D3T co-developed the remaster.)
- Publisher: Microsoft Game Studios (Note: Microsoft Game Studios published the Xbox 360 version, while Remedy Entertainment published the PC version released in 2012. Alan Wake Remastered was published by Epic Games Publishing.)
- Director: Markus Mäki
- Producer: Jyri Ranki
- Designer: Mikael Kasurinen
- Programmer: Olli Tervo
- Artist: Saku Lehtinen
- Writers: Sam Lake; Mikko Rautalahti; Petri Järvilehto
- Composer: Petri Alanko
- Platforms: Xbox 360; Windows; PlayStation 4; PlayStation 5; Xbox One; Xbox Series X/S; Nintendo Switch
- Release: 14 May 2010: Xbox 360; EU: 14 May 2010; NA: 18 May 2010; AU: 20 May 2010; Windows; NA: 16 February 2012; AU: 16 February 2012; EU: 2 March 2012; Remastered; PS4, PS5, Windows, Xbox One, Xbox Series X/S; WW: 5 October 2021; Nintendo Switch; WW: 20 October 2022
- Genres: Action-adventure, third-person shooter
- Mode: Single-player

Alan Wake is a 2010 action-adventure game developed by Remedy Entertainment and published by Microsoft Game Studios. The game was released in May 2010 for the Xbox 360, with a Windows version following in February 2012 and a remastered version released for PlayStation 4, PlayStation 5, Xbox One, Xbox Series X/S, and Windows in October 2021, as well as a Nintendo Switch version in October 2022. The story follows bestselling crime thriller novelist Alan Wake as he tries to uncover the mystery behind his wife's disappearance during a vacation in the small fictional town of Bright Falls, Washington, all while experiencing events from the plot of his latest novel, which he cannot remember writing, coming to life.

In its pacing and structure, Alan Wake is similar to a thriller television series, with episodes that contain plot twists and cliffhangers. The game consists of six episodes, and the storyline continues in two special episodes, The Signal and The Writer, that were made available as downloadable content (DLC) in the year of the game's release. Additionally, a six-episode live-action web series called Bright Falls acts as a prequel to the game, and a number of related books also expand upon the Alan Wake story.

Written by Sam Lake and Mikko Rautalahti, Alan Wake took over five years to create. The game was originally developed as an open-world survival game as an antithesis to Remedy's prior linear Max Payne games, but the team struggled over three years to merge the gameplay with an action-thriller story. In two months, the team reworked the game into a more traditional linear game with an episodic approach that better supported the planned narrative structure, and which allowed the team to reuse previously created open-world assets.

The game received positive reviews from critics, has garnered a cult following, and is often praised for its visuals, sound, narrative, pacing and atmosphere. It was awarded the first spot in Time magazine's list of the top 10 video games of 2010. Alan Wake's American Nightmare, a stand-alone spin-off, was released in February 2012 on the Xbox Live Arcade service. A cancelled sequel became the foundation of Remedy's next title, Quantum Break. Later, Remedy released Control in 2019, which takes place in a shared universe with Alan Wake. A sequel, Alan Wake 2, was released in 2023.

== Gameplay ==
Above, the player, as Alan, "fight[s] with light" against a Taken. The ammo counter for the gun is visible at the top right, and the flashlight meter at the top left.

Alan Wake is described by Remedy as "the mind of a psychological thriller" and "the body of a cinematic action game" put together. In interviews, the game's creators hold that the game does not belong squarely in the survival horror video-game genre. The game is primarily set in the fictional idyllic small town of Bright Falls, Washington. The main gameplay happens in various areas of Bright Falls—such as the forest, a national park, or a farm—during the night time; these are punctuated by calmer, non-combative sequences set during the day.

The player controls the eponymous protagonist Alan Wake, a well-known novelist who is going through writer's block. In the game, a "darkness" is taking over humans, animals, and objects. These enemies, dubbed the "Taken", are murderous shadows that attack Wake, wielding weapons of their own, ranging from mallets and knives to shovels and chainsaws. They vary by speed, size and the amount of damage they can take, and some can teleport short distances. Besides the Taken, the player must combat flocks of possessed ravens and animated objects. When enemies are close, Alan can perform a slow-motion cinematic dodge maneuver.

The Taken are protected by a shield of darkness, initially rendering them impervious to attack; they can only be injured with a firearm after exposure to light, which burns the darkness away. This puts significant emphasis on flashlights in conjunction with conventional weapons, such as a revolver or shotgun. Flashlight beams act as a reticle. The handheld lights Wake can carry can be boosted, which destroys the darkness faster, but also reduces the light's battery level. Besides the conventional shooter gameplay need for reloading ammunition, the player must also insert fresh batteries into the flashlight when they run out, or wait for it to recharge slowly. The strength of the darkness protecting an enemy can vary among the Taken. The amount of darkness "shield" remaining on an enemy is represented by a corona of light that appears when aiming at an enemy. Instead of traditional health bars, this shield is represented by a circle that decreases in diameter as it weakens. A stronger darkness may recharge after exposure to light over time. When a Taken is finally destroyed, it disappears.

The player is often encouraged to take advantage of environmental light sources and places, and to use other light-based weapons and accessories, such as flare guns, hand-held flares and flashbangs. Wake can use searchlights to take out massive waves of Taken. Streetlights and other light stands can provide a safe haven, which the Taken cannot enter, and will regenerate the character's health faster. Otherwise, health regenerates slowly with time, when not taking any damage. In certain sections of the game, it is possible to use a car to traverse between locations in Bright Falls. When in a car, the player can run down Taken on the road, or boost the vehicle's headlights to destroy them.

A major element of gameplay is the optional discovery and collection of manuscript pages from Alan Wake's latest novel, Departure. Although Wake does not remember writing this book, its storyline seems to be coming to life around him. These readable manuscript pages are scattered around the game world, out of chronological order; they often describe scenes that have yet to occur and act as warning and instructions for proceeding through upcoming challenges. Other optional collectibles include coffee thermos flasks scattered around the game world (100 in all), and players can discover television sets showing different episodes of the fictional Night Springs series, radios airing talk and music from Bright Falls's local radio station, and textual signs around the town. The radio shows and signs provide a deeper understanding of the town's history and culture. The game's downloadable content episodes introduce other collectibles such as alarm clocks.

== Plot ==
Alan Wake (voiced by Matthew Porretta) is a bestselling crime fiction author from New York City who suffers from a two-year stretch of writer's block. He and his wife Alice travel to the small mountain town of Bright Falls, Washington, for a short vacation on the advice of their friend and agent Barry Wheeler. Before arriving, Alan has a nightmare about shadowy figures who try to kill him, when an ethereal figure in a diving suit intervenes in the dream and teaches him how to utilize light to fend off the shadows.

Upon arrival in Bright Falls, Alan goes to a diner to retrieve the keys to their cabin from Carl Stucky, the landlord, but instead encounters a mysterious old woman, who tells him that Stucky had fallen ill and she was entrusted to give Alan the keys. The woman directs the couple to a cabin on an island in the middle of Cauldron Lake, a volcanic crater lake, where Alan experiences a vision of the old woman. As they unpack, Alice reveals that the real purpose of their trip is to help break his writer's block by arranging for him to see a famous Bright Falls psychologist named Dr. Emil Hartman. Alan is infuriated and storms out, only to rush back when he hears Alice crying for help. He returns just as Alice is dragged into the lake's waters by a mysterious force. Alan dives in after her, blacking out as he submerges.

After yet another hallucination of the old woman, Alan regains consciousness, apparently having driven his car off the road with no memory of how he got there. He attempts to reach a nearby gas station but progress is hampered by murderous, shadowy figures resembling those in his dream. While fighting the shadows with light, Alan repeatedly encounters an ethereal figure in a diving suit similar to the one from his dream, who leaves behind pages of a manuscript entitled Departure. Ostensibly written by Alan, he has no memory of writing it. He soon discovers that the events of the manuscript are coming true and that the shadowy figures, named "Taken," are townsfolk possessed by a dark force. After killing a possessed Carl Stucky and reaching the gas station, Alan tries to alert Sheriff Sarah Breaker of his wife's disappearance but Sheriff Breaker states that there has been no island or cabin in Cauldron Lake for decades after it sank in a volcanic eruption. Breaker believes Alan is mentally unwell and takes him to the police station. Meanwhile, Barry arrives in Bright Falls in search of Alan.

At the police station, Alan lies to hide the hallucinations he has been experiencing. He receives a call from a man purporting to be Alice's kidnapper, demanding the pages of Departure in exchange for her. Emil Hartman appears at the station to invite Alan to stay at his psychiatric hospital, Cauldron Lake Lodge—Alan punches Hartman as a response. Alan meets the kidnapper Mott at a nearby national park, who demands pages of Departure as ransom. The two fight before Mott runs off into the night.

Alan and Barry attempt to retrieve more pages and attract the attention of FBI agent Robert Nightingale. Alan leaves Barry behind and flees Nightingale, who chases him through the forest unsuccessfully. He meets Mott again to deliver the pages. As he arrives at the location he witnesses Mott being tortured by the mysterious old woman, confessing that he never actually had Alice. Alan and Mott are then attacked by a dark tornado that hurls Alan into Cauldron Lake.

He awakens in the lodge overlooking Cauldron Lake under the care of Hartman who claims Alan is experiencing a psychotic break, triggered by Alice drowning. He claims the supernatural phenomena Alan has been experiencing were all fabrications of his imagination. Alan attempts to escape the lodge as the shadowy force starts to attack it, learning in the process that the fake kidnapper was employed by Hartman to lure Alan to him. Hartman tries to stop Alan from escaping, and gives the impression that he is aware of the supernatural events surrounding the lake. Barry helps Alan escape the lodge before the shadow subsumes it and all those inside.

Alan and Barry gradually begin to learn the truth about Cauldron Lake from other townsfolk. An entity known as the Dark Presence is trapped within the lake, attempting to escape by using the lake's power to turn literature into reality. It had previously tried this with a poet named Thomas Zane—the figure in the diving suit—by taking the form of his spouse who drowned in the lake, Barbara Jagger, the old woman Alan encountered. Zane was able to resist its will and used his writings to cause the volcanic eruption that sank the island, stranding himself within the lake. The Dark Presence has grown strong enough to start to influence the townspeople and create the forces that have pursued Alan. That night as Alan and Barry take shelter, they get drunk on moonshine and Alan recalls memories of being forced to write Departure during the prior week. He realised that the Dark Presence is trying to use his writings to escape, holding Alice in the lake so as to coerce him.

Alan and Barry are arrested by Robert Nightingale but the Taken assault the police station and drag Nightingale away. Sheriff Breaker, now convinced of the Dark Presence's existence, helps Alan and Barry to reach Cynthia Weaver, a hermit who knew Thomas Zane and prepared countermeasures for the Dark Presence's return. Weaver leads them to the "Well-Lit Room" containing a light switch known as the Clicker, which, through the power of Alan's writings, possesses the narrative ability to destroy the Dark Presence. Alan returns to Cauldron Lake alone and dives in, finding himself in a surreal alternate dimension known as the Dark Place, where thoughts and ideas become reality. Alan encounters Jagger and destroys her with the Clicker; realising he must maintain balance in the story, Alan completes Departure by freeing Alice, but strands himself in the Dark Place in the process. Finishing Departure, Alan writes the final line, "It's not a lake, it's an ocean."

=== Special One: The Signal ===
Continuing from the end of the main game, Alan finds himself in a surreal version of Bright Falls and realises he is still trapped in the Dark Place. Zane directs Alan to follow a signal through a cell phone in order to "focus" and guide himself through the Dark Place. While navigating the realm's shifting, dreamlike topography, Alan encounters television screens depicting a more maniacal version of himself, who uses the power of the Dark Place to narrate circumstances that plunge Alan into danger, sending hordes of Taken after him. Alan also encounters an ethereal version of Barry, a figment of his subconsciousness, who helps guide Alan safely across the abstract landscape.

Zane eventually reveals that Alan himself is the cause of his current circumstance; the maniacal version of Alan on the television screens is an irrational aspect of Alan consumed by fear, his frenzied thoughts affecting the subjective world of the Dark Place. Alan encounters a monstrous conglomeration of televisions, through which the irrational Alan tries to kill him. Alan defeats the televisions, but wakes up back in the cabin again, and realises he is still trapped.

=== Special Two: The Writer ===
Still trapped in the Dark Place, Alan regains consciousness and accepts that he is the cause of the insanity he is experiencing, regaining his memories in the process. Zane tells him that the "irrational Alan" is still inside the cabin, controlling the Dark Place; the "rational Alan" must regain control in order to have any chance of escaping the Dark Place. Zane directs Alan to a lighthouse across the increasingly surreal landscape of the Dark Place, while the irrational Alan attempts to stop him by creating delusions of Alice, manipulating the landscape, and sending armies of Taken after him. Alan eventually outwits his other self and reaches the lighthouse, passing through it to reach the cabin.

As Alan nears the cabin, the imaginary Barry reappears and tells Alan that he will have to reject all the illusions before he can face off against the insane version of Alan, including the apparition of Barry. Alan is forced to confront Taken versions of Barry and the other townsfolk, defeating them all and reentering the cabin. The irrational Alan is in a paranoid state on the cabin floor; when Alan touches him, the two are made whole again. Alan realises that he cannot let himself fall into a delusional state again for fear of never being able to escape, and returns to the typewriter to start a new story.

== Development ==
By 2003, the Finnish studio Remedy Entertainment had created the critically acclaimed Max Payne (2001), and its sequel, Max Payne 2: The Fall of Max Payne (2003). After shipping Max Payne 2, Remedy Entertainment spent some time "recovering from the crunch," and started coming up with different concepts for a new project. Among these was the concept for Alan Wake. Early on, this was based on trying to tell a deeper narrative story than what Max Payne had been, influenced by works of Stephen King and David Lynch, in particular Twin Peaks, and approached as a television episodic format to tell the story of the action-thriller. The basic elements of the narrative were set early on: Alan Wake as a successful writer finds himself in the small town of Bright Falls where due to supernatural events his writings have come to life to attack him.

To further distance this next game from the linear style of Max Payne, Remedy planned Bright Falls as a free-roaming, sandbox-style open world city, similar to those seen in the Grand Theft Auto series. They developed a semi-automatic system to help generate this open world using biomes and other features based on their research on the Pacific Northwest where Bright Falls was set. For example, this tool allowed them to path a road across the game world, upon which the tool would make sure no vegetation would appear near the road though added sprout of grass near its edges, and would add approach ditches and other features along the sides of the roads to simplify the world creation. Remedy also wanted cinematic action, so light and darkness was to play a significant factor in the game, which was first built into a dynamic day-and-night cycle. The game would have been more like a survival game; during daylight hours the player would collect resources, such as gasoline to run portable generators to run lights, as to protect and defend the player-character at night. According to Remedy's creative director Sam Lake, this approach created numerous difficulties in establishing a story and narrative for the thriller to explain how the gameplay elements tied together with the supernatural events. For example, Lake said one idea was based on the supernatural events tied to the no-longer-dormant volcano under Cauldron Lake, which would have led to the evacuation of Bright Falls and left Alan dealing only with the supernatural forces.

The game, still designed around this open-world approach, was announced at E3 2005 in June for "the next generation of consoles and PCs", and was shown to the press behind closed doors in the form of a tech demo. Remedy also used this demo to gain publisher interest. By 2006, Remedy announced they had partnered with Microsoft Game Studios to publish the game exclusively for Microsoft's Xbox 360 video game console and then-current Windows Vista PC operating system.

Remedy still continued to struggle with merging the open-world survival gameplay and story, now further complicated with Microsoft's involvement and suggestions for improvement, which Lake compared to a "too many cooks" situation. They were now missing various publisher milestones as they tried various changes to the open-world format with no clear resolution. Roughly three years into development, the team recognised they needed to stop and refocus on what the core elements of the gameplay was to be. According to Lake, Remedy took the leads from each department to form a "sauna" group, making them work in a room together to lock down the gameplay that Alan Wake should have without losing much of work they had already done, "with all the heat and pressure on us". This took about two months but from it came the revised gameplay loop, which they were able to reapply to the existing open-world setting they had, breaking it apart into linear chapter-sized levels for the final game and adding some additional assets as needed. This allowed some levels to be used for daytime that would be used to advance the story, letting the player talk to NPCs and explore the area, and others for the night levels that were predominately action-based, and even with some levels having both daytime and nighttime versions. This change better supported the thriller narrative as well. Other key gameplay ideas that came out from this period were the ideas for the Taken and how the player would fight them, how these enemies would appear and the in-game signals the player would see and hear to prepare, and the use of lit safe havens between combat. Lake stated that because they kept as much of the previous open-world elements they already built in this rework, this helped to give "a sense of realness" to the game world. Oskari Häkkinen, the head of franchise development at Remedy during Alan Wake's development, said that retaining the open world map, with features planned and rendered in the distance, gave them a means to provide landmarks to give a sense of direction to the player, gave the ability to create foreshadowing in the narrative, and generally helped with overall cohesion of the game world.

The first screenshots depicted the character of Alan Wake in much different attire, as well as a different layout for the town of Bright Falls, compared to the released game.

According to Lake, the character of Alan Wake was also intended to be the opposite of Max Payne. While Max was a cop and thus suited to an action game, Remedy wanted Alan to be atypical of an action hero, making him a writer, partially influenced by King, that became involved in the events and forced into action. Near the end of the game's development, Alan's story started to become a metaphor for Remedy's work on the game itself, according to Lake: Alan's past work as a novelist was based on a fictional police detective (mirroring Remedy's Max Payne), but now struggled with writing something different (representing their troubles in finding the vision for Alan Wake).

The game's enemies were designed by drawing concept art and then pouring water over them to make them feel "Just a bit off". For the character of Alan Wake himself, Remedy used "concept photos" as opposed to more traditional concept artwork. All the characters featured in Alan Wake were based on real-life models. Ilkka Villi and Jonna Järvenpää, the models for Alan and Alice Wake, respectively, are the only Finnish models in the game; all other models were American. Voice-overs were provided by native actors from Japan and America for their respective regions.

After four years of having repeatedly demonstrated the Microsoft Windows version, in 2009, Remedy confirmed that at that point the game was being developed exclusively for the Xbox 360 and the decision to make a PC version was in Microsoft's hands. The game was announced as "done" and undergoing final polishing in August 2009. The game eventually went gold on 7 April 2010, and was released in May.

After the game's release in 2010, Remedy said that bringing the game to the PC was "not on the cards at the moment." However, nearly two years after its release, Remedy was able to secure the rights to publish a PC version.

=== Influences and allusions ===
Alan Wake was influenced by and often alludes to certain films, TV shows and books, as well as paying homage to a number of artists and works. Remedy has explained the shared themes and ideas between the game and other existing works of popular culture as "taking something familiar to people as an element, and building something of your own, and hopefully something [that is] unique in games, but still familiar from other forms of entertainment."

According to creator Sam Lake, Alan Wake is influenced by, and pays homage to two main sources, one being the works of David Lynch - specifically Twin Peaks - and the other being the bestselling author, Stephen King.

For the world-building, background characters, and smaller references in the game, Lake and the team at Remedy drew most prominently from Twin Peaks. Lake also sought to draw from a Lynchian mix of horror and absurd humour for the atmosphere of Alan Wake. The setting, Bright Falls, draws much inspiration from the titular town featured in Twin Peaks; both fictional small towns in the state of Washington. To research the Pacific Northwest setting for the game, a Remedy team travelled to the area and drove about 2,000 miles between Oregon; Washington; and British Columbia, Canada, over two weeks, bringing back over 6,000 photographs and videos of various natural settings and Americana of the small towns in the area. These included Astoria, Oregon and North Bend, Washington, the latter where Twin Peaks was filmed, as well as locations used around Seattle for the film The Ring. Even after returning to Finland, the Remedy team contacted Microsoft, based in Washington, for help with additional photographs.

The main character as a writer whose work is coming true is a theme that has been explored by Stephen King in a number of his works. Wake's narration directly alludes to King on several occasions, including the game's opening line, in which he quotes a Stephen King essay. The game also pays homage to the film The Shining (based on King's novel of the same name) with a hedge maze area similar to the iconic maze in the film, among other references, as well as King's novel Christine, with one of the in-game cars resembling her. King himself was asked for permission to use his quote. He also received copies of the game as a "thank you", but was unable to try them out because he does not own an Xbox. In addition to King's work, Lake has cited the stories of Bret Easton Ellis and Neil Gaiman as influences, as well as Mark Z. Danielewski's House of Leaves.

Additionally, in the game there are a number of television sets that can be found around the town in different places, an allusion to the show within a show Invitation to Love, that is featured within Twin Peaks. They can be switched on and a short episode of the fictional series Night Springs will be played, which is a reference to the television series The Twilight Zone, created by Rod Serling in the late 1950s. The televisions and Night Springs are itself a callback to the Twin Peaks-inspired show-within-the game Address Unknown from Remedy's earlier Max Payne games. Alfred Hitchcock is also cited as an inspiration, with the flocks of birds that often attack the protagonist being influenced by his classic horror film The Birds.

=== Episodic format ===
In its structure, the story of Alan Wake plays out similarly to a mystery television program, where each episode brings another piece of the puzzle to the main ongoing story, yet have a distinct plot of their own. As such, Alan Wake is organised into episodes, which include narrative and plot devices normally used in TV, such as cliffhangers at the end of the episodes. A prominent borrowing from television is the "Previously on Alan Wake..." recap sequence that opens each episode, and serve to "refresh the player's memory and point to things that will become relevant shortly." A different song plays at the end of every episode, imitating certain TV shows that feature different music during each episode's closing credits.

The main game itself is divided up into six episodes. Additionally, two "special features", titled "The Signal" and "The Writer", have been released as downloadable content (DLC). Together, Alan Wake and its DLCs constitute the "first season" of a bigger story. The main game is designed to have a satisfactory ending with the main character reaching his goal, while the DLCs form a two-part special that further expands on the game's story by "[continuing] the fiction and [serving] as a bridge between seasons." The game's developers expressed interest in following Alan Wake up with a second season or a sequel.

Remedy Entertainment chose the TV series storytelling format to establish a certain stylisation and pacing. The developers felt that watching episodes of certain TV shows—such as the heavily serialised series Lost—in the form of released box sets, at the viewers' pace, was a "natural way of 'consuming media'", and that this episodic format was a better fit for a long game. Remedy lauded Lost for its pacing as a thriller TV show.

While Remedy had wanted to use the episodic release format, with each of the above episodes released digitally over time, Microsoft instead pushed Remedy to release the main game as a full product on retail disc. Phil Spencer, head of Xbox Game Studios, said in 2020 that at the time, Microsoft was concerned about if the episode format would work and its revenue potentials, projecting there would be declining sales with each successive episode, and instead believed a single release was likely more profitable. Spencer said that since then, they recognised this was likely a bad decision as it forced them into a certain way of thinking with respect to monetisation.

=== Product placement ===
A number of real-life brands and products appear in Alan Wake. The developers said that they tried to "be very conservative and attentive towards gamers" with their use of product placement, and that they aimed "to make the world feel more real rather than put ads in-your-face."

Examples of such marketing include collectable Energizer batteries and lithium batteries to insert into the player's hand-held lights. The Energizer advertisement was lampooned, given that the batteries last only very briefly in game and must constantly be changed out. The phone service provider Verizon Wireless is another prominent brand in Alan Wake: besides Verizon branded mobile phones appearing on screen, there is a 30-second Verizon commercial viewable on one of the game's interactive TVs, as well as an allusion to the company's famous advertising line "Can you hear me now?" during a phone conversation in "The Signal" DLC. Additionally, billboards around Bright Falls advertise both Energizer and Verizon. Ford and Lincoln automobiles are also featured in the game.

Several Microsoft-related brands also appear in the game. Alan and Alice Wake's car shows that it has the Microsoft-powered Ford Sync in-vehicle entertainment system. An Xbox 360 console can be seen in one section of the game, with the box of the fictional Night Springs video game next to it, which are collectibles in "The Writer" DLC episode. In multiple sections of the game, Microsoft Tag bar codes can be seen; these can be scanned in real life by the user with the appropriate software on their mobile device. When scanned, these tags redirect players to a phone number with the voicemail from one of the game's characters, or to a Verizon-sponsored web site where users gain access to exclusive Alan Wake extras for their console. This functionality is only available in the United States.

The product placement has been removed in the remastered version, as the branding deals had expired.

=== Soundtrack ===
The game's score is composed by Petri Alanko. The soundtrack features the song "War" by Poets of the Fall, from the band's fourth studio album, Twilight Theater. Sam Lake said that the song "...is a prominent part of the Alan Wake soundtrack and the theme also links strongly to the game's storyline." Poets of the Fall also perform two original songs, "Children of the Elder God" and "The Poet and the Muse", under the name Old Gods of Asgard. The band wrote the ending theme to Remedy's previous game, Max Payne 2: The Fall of Max Payne, called "Late Goodbye", which is based on a poem written by Lake. "War", however, was not written specifically for Alan Wake. On 20 July 2010, an official soundtrack consisting of 18 tracks was released.

In addition to the original soundtrack and these songs, Alan Wake includes several licensed songs used typically at the closing of each episode or elsewhere. "Haunted" by Poe plays at the end of the second episode. "Space Oddity" by David Bowie plays over the end credits. Anomie Belle's "How Can I Be Sure" is featured in the third episode. "Coconut" by Harry Nilsson is played several times during the game.

Due to expiration of these music licenses, all digital and retail versions of Alan Wake were pulled from purchase from the various storefronts in May 2017; Remedy offered a large discount for the title in the days prior to removal. The removal did not affect those who already own the game, nor did it impact the availability of Alan Wake's American Nightmare, though that title will likely be affected similarly when its own licensing deals expire. With the help of Microsoft, Remedy was able to resecure these licensing rights by October 2018 and the game was relisted on digital storefronts.

== Marketing and release ==
Alan Wake was first released exclusively for the Xbox 360 video game console. The game was scheduled to be released on 18 May 2010 in North America, and on 21 May in Europe. When the game went gold on 7 April 2010, the European release date was moved up a week. Therefore, the game was released in Europe first, on 14 May 2010, and then in North America on 18 May, as originally scheduled. On 23 November 2010, Alan Wake was released on the Games on Demand service of Xbox Live. On 16 February 2012, a version of the game for Microsoft Windows was released.

Alan Wake was also released in a limited collector's edition, packaged in a case resembling a hardcover book. The collector's edition contains the game, a book titled The Alan Wake Files, and an exclusive soundtrack CD. It also features a developer commentary, and lends access to virtual items for Xbox 360, such as themes and Avatar clothes.

=== Microsoft Windows version ===
Despite the cancellation of the PC version at the same time as the Xbox 360 release as a result of Microsoft's decision, Remedy's Oskari Häkkinen stated that "PC gaming is part of Remedy's heritage" and that the developers still wanted to release a PC version of the game. Remedy continued pressing Microsoft to allow the creation of a PC version, eventually gaining it in mid-2011; Häkkinen attributed Microsoft's agreement partially to their repeated requests, but as well as Remedy's good standing with Microsoft, and the time factor, having the PC version be available ahead of American Nightmare. Development of the PC version began in earnest, with a small team from Remedy working with Finnish independent developer Nitro Games. Instead of starting from the scrapped PC version, the team worked from the Xbox 360 code and added in new features to take advantage of more powerful elements on modern PC machines. Core to the PC version was to make sure that the game played well using typical keyboard and mouse controls in addition to a controller, and to assure the graphics exceeded the limitations of the Xbox 360; Matias Myllyrinne, Remedy's CEO, stated that these elements were important, as "If this is not tuned to perfection, all the visuals are lost and the emotional touchstones are missed". The PC version was completed in about five months, and the game formally announced to the public in December 2011.

The game, which includes the main game and both DLC chapters, was released on the Steam platform on 16 February 2012. Within 48 hours, Remedy announced that revenue from sale of this version surpassed their development and marketing costs for the game. A retail PC version, distributed by Nordic Games, was released on 2 March 2012, in both a regular edition and a collector's edition, containing a soundtrack disc, The Alan Wake Files, and other special content. The PC retail release for the United States was released on 24 April 2012, being distributed by Legacy Interactive.

In December 2013, Remedy and Xbox released a special collector's edition of the game, with new content on the disc, including a 44-page digital comic book with art by Gerry Kissell and Amin Amat, and written by Remedy Entertainment's Mikko Rautalahti, who also wrote the script for the video game.

=== Bright Falls web series ===
A promotional live-action tie-in web series/miniseries titled Bright Falls was made available a few weeks before the game's release on the web and the Xbox Live service. The six episodes of Bright Falls were co-written and directed by Phillip Van, and they serve as a prequel to the game, set in the eponymous town before Alan Wake arrives there. The main character in the series is Jake Fischer (played by Christopher Forsyth), a newspaper reporter who visits the town on business.

A number of characters are shared between Bright Falls and Alan Wake, including diner waitress Rose, Dr. Emil Hartman, radio host Pat Maine and Alan Wake himself, who appears briefly in the final episode. The actors who play these characters also serve as voice actors and physical models for the characters in the game. The episodes were filmed in rural areas of Oregon and Washington, trying to match settings with the in-game locations as best as possible, according to Van.

The web series begins as Jake Fischer arrives in Bright Falls to interview Dr. Hartman on his new book, an assignment from his publication agency. After a series of encounters with local townspeople, Jake soon finds himself the victim of long periods of lost time and black outs. He finds himself waking up in the middle of a forest and other locations where he had not been previously. He also develops an aversion towards lights and daytime. The longer he stays in Bright Falls, the more violent his behaviour becomes. When he realises this, he tries to duct-tape himself to a refrigerator and recording videotape himself in his sleep to see what might be causing the behaviour. It is implied that he is being completely taken over by the Dark Presence, to the point of murdering several people. He then vanishes, just before the arrival of Alan and Alice Wake.

=== Downloadable content ===
During 2010, two "special feature" episodes of Alan Wake were developed and released as downloadable content (DLC) on the Xbox Live service, which serve to bridge the gap between the game's ending, and a possible sequel.

The first of the two, titled "The Signal", was released on 27 July 2010. David Houghton of GamesRadar+ said it was one of the best segments of the game, but worried that it made the main game feel comparatively less impressive.

The second episode, "The Writer", was released on 12 October 2010. Erik Brudvig of IGN called it a must-buy for anyone that already purchased "The Signal", and said it satisfyingly closed out the game's story. He did feel that both DLCs were pricey for the amount of content they provided.

=== Books ===
The limited collector's edition of the game includes a 144-page book called The Alan Wake Files, which expands on the storyline of the game. A novelisation of Alan Wake was written by Rick Burroughs. An art/making of book, entitled Alan Wake: Illuminated is also available.

=== Delisting and Relisting ===
In 2017, Alan Wake was pulled from digital storefronts as the rights to the game's licensed music was expiring. This included David Bowie's A Space Oddity among other tracks, originally used to close out each episode. The delisting was marked by a "Sunset Sale" with the game 90% discounted on May 13, ahead of the removal on May 15. The game was ultimately restored the following year with the licensed music patched out. Some original music was composed to replace the licensed tracks for the update.

== Reception ==
=== Critical response ===
Reception

Aggregate score
| Aggregator | Score |
|---|---|
| Metacritic | X360: 83/100; PC: 83/100 |

Review scores
| Publication | Score |
|---|---|
| 1Up.com | B+ |
| Computer and Video Games | 9.0/10 |
| Eurogamer | 7/10 |
| Famitsu | 9/10, 9/10, 8/10, 8/10 |
| Game Informer | 8.5/10 |
| GamePro | 4/5 |
| GameSpot | 8.5/10 |
| GameTrailers | 8.6/10 |
| IGN | 9/10 |
| Official Xbox Magazine (US) | 9/10 |
| Spawn Kill | 8.5/10 |
| Wired | 6/10 |

Awards
| Publication | Award |
|---|---|
| IGN | Editors' Choice Award |
| Time | No. 1 video game of 2010 |

Alan Wake received "generally favorable" reviews on both platforms according to review aggregator website Metacritic.

Michael Plant from The Independent gave the game a score of 5/5. He praised Alan Wake for its "flawless pacing", which "ensures a compulsive experience". The editing and plot were also received very positively, making the game "the kind of experience the current console generation was made for."

The Daily Telegraph rated the game 9/10 with editor Nick Cowen being impressed by its "stunning" look, stating the town of Bright Falls and its surrounding environment to be "authentic" in terms of architecture, vegetation, weather and lighting. He described the atmosphere as being able to "turn on a dime from feeling safe and serene to one of choking menace and foreboding". Combat mechanics and plot were also praised, with the former making "the player feel constantly under threat" and the latter being described as one of the game's "strongest assets". Criticism included the quality of the facial animation and the relatively short length of the game.

Dirk Lammers said the game kept "players on the edge of their seats", giving a final score of 4 out of 4 in his review for the Associated Press. Matt Greenop from The New Zealand Herald rated the game 5/5 and praised the game's "excellent pace" due to its episodic format. He also praised the "chilling" storyline, "brilliant environments" and concluded the game to be "one of the most innovative and entertaining titles so far this year." William Vitka from the New York Post graded it B+, praising the game for its "scary atmosphere", music, graphics and "surprising level of complexity" in combat, but commented negatively on the game's animation and storyline.

Brian Crecente, editor-in-chief of Kotaku, praised the general use of light as a gameplay-mechanic. He commented on the episodic structure, saying it made the player feel satisfied even after short gameplay sessions. He also praised the overall storyline, having played the final episode thrice in a row, saying: "For the first time in my life, I have experienced something that plays like a game but has the impact of a movie... Alan Wake is a powerful ride, an experience bound to leave you thinking about it and wanting more for days after its completion." He criticised the game for not providing enough information about Wake and his wife, despite being "packed with memorable people", but concluded that the game "redefines interactive storytelling".

Tom McShea criticised the game for lacking "surprising, memorable gameplay moments" in his review for GameSpot, but hailed it for its "fresh" story-telling, great original as well as licensed music, "subtle" lighting effects, which, along with the soundtrack, "create a disturbing atmosphere", "satisfying" combat system and "clever" inclusion of collectibles, giving a final score of 8.5/10.

IGN's Charles Onyett scored the game 9/10, providing it with the "Editors' Choice Award". He described it as "hard to put down once you have started", and appreciated the game for its episodic structure, "interesting" story-telling mechanic, lighting effects, soundtrack and combat system, which he described as "fast and responsive", but criticised the writing as "uneven". The game received high marks for its "strong atmosphere", "fun gameplay" and "great visuals", but lost some due to its "weak ending".

Tom Orry from VideoGamer.com also awarded a score of 9/10, praising the game for its "clever narrative", "incredible atmosphere" and soundtrack which he described as "one of the best and most memorable I've ever heard in a video game". GameTrailers gave the game an 8.6/10. The review praised the game's presentation for "selling you completely on its twisted nightmare", and providing a "genuine sense of dread". Eurogamer's Ellie Gibson awarded a score of 7/10, stating that although she did not consider the game to be very original, she found it accessible and undemanding, with a "neat combat mechanic".

Chris Kohler from Wired was more critical and gave it 6/10, saying "when presented with an infinite number of possible resolutions, any answer is going to feel arbitrary. Alan Wake starts strong but finishes weak. Neither the gameplay nor the story deliver on their potential by the time the credits roll". Kohler, however, praised the main character, certain gameplay decisions and "unique story".

=== Awards ===
Alan Wake has received a number of nominations and awards for its achievements in video gaming in 2010. Editors of Time magazine rendered Alan Wake the best video game of 2010. In its Best Xbox 360 Games of 2010 list, IGN awarded Alan Wake "Best Horror Game", and also nominated it for "Best Story," "Coolest Atmosphere," "Most Innovative Gameplay," and "Best Character" (for the character of Alan Wake). The game was nominated in the "Best Xbox 360 Game" category at the 2010 Spike Video Game Awards, and received three nominations at the 2nd Annual Inside Gaming Awards in the categories "Best Narrative," "Best Sound Design" and "Most Compelling Character" (for Alan Wake). GameSpot's Best Games of 2010 Awards featured seven nominations for the game, including "Best Story" and "Best Writing/Dialogue," and won the reader's choice award for "Best Original IP." IGN ranked it No. 61 in their "Top Modern Games" ranking. During the 14th Annual Interactive Achievement Awards, the Academy of Interactive Arts & Sciences nominated Alan Wake for "Adventure Game of the Year", "Outstanding Achievement in Art Direction", and "Outstanding Achievement in Story".

The game's soundtrack has won Best Score – European at the 2010 Annual Game Music Awards, with the panel stating "Breaking composer Petri Alanko's expansive score for the critically acclaimed Alan Wake captured the hearts of gamers and stand-alone listeners alike with its intimate orchestrations and psychological explorations."

Awards and nominations for Alan Wake
| Year | Awards | Category | Result | Ref. |
|---|---|---|---|---|
| 2010 | Spike Video Game Awards 2010 | Best Xbox 360 Game | Nominated | |
| 2011 | British Academy Video Games Awards (7th) | Original Music | Nominated | |
| 2011 | British Academy Video Games Awards (7th) | Story | Nominated | |
| 2011 | British Academy Video Games Awards (7th) | Use of Audio | Nominated | |
| 2011 | Interactive Achievement Awards (14th) | Adventure Game of the Year | Nominated | |
| 2011 | Interactive Achievement Awards (14th) | Outstanding Achievement in Art Direction | Nominated | |
| 2011 | Interactive Achievement Awards (14th) | Outstanding Achievement in Story | Nominated | |

=== Sales ===
Alan Wake was released the same week as Red Dead Redemption, and initial sales were slow; NPD Group stated sales for the first two weeks reached 145,000 units while Red Dead Redemption had reached 1.5 million during the same period. However, in the months that followed, it gained more sales traction through word-of-mouth.

IndustryGamers reported in December 2011 that sales of Alan Wake, currently reported at 330,000 by NPD Group, were omitting about 900,000 units digitally redeemed during the Xbox's 2011 Holiday Bundle, in addition to an additional 170,000 global units, bringing the total sales to around 1.4 million.

On 13 March 2012, Remedy Entertainment announced that the game had passed 2 million copies sold, including Xbox 360 and PC. On 23 May 2013, Remedy creative director Sam Lake announced that the game and its stand-alone follow-up had sold 3 million copies. On 25 March 2015, Remedy's CEO Matias Myllyrinne tweeted that the franchise had sold over 4.5 million units. The following month, a Polygon story on the game's prototype for a sequel mentioned that Alan Wake had sold more than 3.2 million copies.

According to a report, Alan Wake was the second-most-illegally copied Xbox 360 game of 2010, with more than 1.1 million downloads. The game indicates that a version was pirated by giving the player character an eyepatch.

== Related works ==
=== Spin-off and sequel ===
At Alan Wake's release, Remedy had intended for a sequel; developer Oskari Häkkinen stated that Remedy saw the game as "Season 1" and its DLC was to "bridge the gap to what we're working towards." Häkkinen stated they were not directly working on a sequel at that time, as Microsoft had focused them to complete the DLC. Writer Mikko Rautalahti adds the story is "bigger than one game" and the sequel would be "weird and wonderful".

In May 2011, leaked information led to Remedy confirming they were working on a new Alan Wake project, but affirmed it was not a full sequel. This was ultimately revealed to be Alan Wake's American Nightmare, a short standalone game released in 2012 that follows Alan's adventures after the first game that they wanted to release on the Xbox Live Arcade platform. The Remedy team had looked at a project borrowing from zombie and monster films like From Dusk till Dawn, and wanted to create more of a sandbox mode for players to fight off waves of enemies (which became the game's Arcade mode, "Fight Till Dawn"); they then worked these elements into Alan's story, keeping the theme of The Twilight Zone to progress the story.

Alan Wake 2 was announced at The Game Awards 2021, for planned release in 2023 on Windows, PlayStation 5 and Xbox Series X/S. The game was released on October 27, 2023, published by Epic Games Publishing. Unlike Alan Wake, which is an action-adventure game, Alan Wake 2 is a survival horror game.

=== Subsequent Remedy games ===
Following Alan Wake: American Nightmare, Remedy released Quantum Break in 2016, and then Control in 2019. Control is based in the fictional Federal Bureau of Control (FBC) set in the Oldest House in New York City that seeks out paranormal activity and secures objects that may be behind "Altered World Events" (AWEs). Control describes the events in Bright Falls as an AWE for the Bureau; elements of Alan Wake, such as Alan himself, the typewriter and cabin, and the Clicker, are mentioned in memos within Control.

Control's second paid DLC, titled "AWE", was released in August 2020, featured "what the [Federal Bureau of Control] has been investigating regarding Alan Wake". The expansion reveals that after Alan had disappeared into Cauldron Lake, Dr. Hartman continued to study the Dark Presence until the arrival of the Bureau, who took all his research. Infuriated, Dr. Hartman dove into the lake himself where the Dark Presence, with Alan's persona still within it, took over his body. The Bureau captured Hartman and brought him back to the Oldest House in New York City. During events of Control, Hartman escaped, and the fusion of the Hiss and Dark Presence became a monstrous being that Jesse is forced to subdue, with advice given to her by Alan through mysterious visions. After finishing off Hartman, Jesse is warned of a new AWE in Bright Falls, but oddly from a future date.

Prior to the release of "AWE", creative director Sam Lake announced that Remedy was establishing a "Remedy Connected Universe" shared by Alan Wake, Control and later Alan Wake 2, and called the expansion the "first official Remedy Connected Universe crossover event".

=== Alan Wake Remastered ===
Remedy announced a remaster of Alan Wake on The Sudden Stop, a Remedy fansite, in early September 2021. The remaster was co-developed by Remedy and D3T, and was distributed through Epic Games Publishing. Alan Wake Remastered was released on October 5, 2021, for Windows, Xbox One and Xbox Series X/S, and for the first time on the PlayStation platform via PlayStation 4 and PlayStation 5. It was released for Nintendo Switch on 20 October 2022.

Remedy felt a remaster was the better route than a remake, maintaining the core gameplay and narrative elements of the game but improving the visuals for newer game systems with support for 4K resolutions so that the title would appeal to both those that played the original and new players. Remedy recognised that changing any part of the gameplay would have cascading effects across the game and would lead to major redesign issues, and did not opt to go that route. Several visual assets were remade for high-definition visuals, including reworking some of the non-3D elements such as water movement into 3D motion. Cutscenes were also remade incorporating original and new assets including new motion capture, though due to this combination, limited their presentation to 30 frames per second. They opted to keep the game in the original engine rather than upgrade it to their Northlight Engine as that would have taken resources away from the remastering aspect, and decided against support for ray tracing and high-dynamic-range rendering given the range of systems they needed to support.

The remastered version removed the product placement that had been in the original game, but retained all of the same licensed music. In addition to these improvements, the remastered edition includes both pieces of DLC and a new commentary track by Sam Lake. The remastered version was found to contain at least one new Easter egg to Control, via way of a letter from Bright Falls' sheriff to the FBC about paranormal events happening in town which, through in-game dates, correlate with the FBC's investigation of the Bright Falls AWE as revealed in Control's DLC.

Remedy said they had no plans on remastering Alan Wake's American Nightmare, believing that Alan Wake and the two DLC episodes formed a "sensible" package.

=== Television series ===
In September 2018, Remedy Entertainment and Contradiction Films announced plans to develop a live-action Alan Wake series, with Peter Calloway as the showrunner and Remedy's Sam Lake as executive producer. Contradiction Film's Tomas Harlan had seen Alan Wake's potential as a television series, in part that the game was constructed in episodic chapters and presented in a linear fashion, and had spoken to Lake about it several times, and in 2018 began to start on a firm planning process, which including bringing Calloway on board during the E3 2018. The show plans to use concepts from the scrapped Alan Wake 2, as well as building upon what the first game and American Nightmare provided; Harlan does not expect the series to be in lock-step with the game and while Alan Wake would be the central character of the series, they would spend more time developing his companions from the game. The group planned to shop the series around to networks in October. Lake affirmed the television series was still being developed during a December 2020 investors' meeting. In May 2022, Remedy announced that AMC acquired the rights to develop a series. With the August 2024 announcement of a strategic partnership between Remedy and Annapurna Pictures for development of Control 2 and giving Annapurna options for film and television series based on Alan Wake and Control, Remedy confirmed that the AMC series was no longer in development.

=== Other projects ===
Epic Games, which handled the publishing for Alan Wake 2, created a special island on Fortnite Creative for recapping the first game. The island, titled "Alan Wake: Flashback", retells brief key moments from the game through the interactive story-telling as described by Alan himself. Made in collaboration with Spiral House and Zen Creative alongside Remedy, the island was accessible within the Fortnite client by entering their island code (3426-5561-3374).

On January 30, 2024, Alan Wake was added as one of the playable survivors in Dead by Daylight.

== Literature ==
- Eugen Pfister: The Seven Political Myths of ‘Alan Wake’. In: Horror - Game - Politics. April 15. 2022
