= Signs of Life (Poets of the Fall album) =

Studio album by Poets of the Fall
- Released: 19 January 2005
- Genre: Alternative rock
- Length: 51:35
- Label: Insomniac
- Producer: Poets of the Fall

Poets of the Fall chronology
| Signs of Life (2005) | Carnival of Rust (2006) |

Singles from Signs of Life
- 1. "Late Goodbye" Released: 30 June 2004; 2. "Lift" Released: 9 September 2004

Professional ratings
Review scores
| Source | Rating |
|---|---|
| Glory Daze | 9.5/10 stars |

Signs of Life is the debut album by the Finnish rock band Poets of the Fall. It was released on 19 January 2005 and debuted at number-one on the Finnish charts. The album was certified platinum on 26 April 2006 and remained in the Top 40 for more than one year (56 weeks). The album was released on the iTunes Music Shop in Finland, Norway, Denmark and Sweden in August 2005. It was released on iTunes for worldwide purchase on 12 April 2008. A limited vinyl-edition was released on the band's official webshop on 19 January 2011.

== Trivia ==
The title Signs of Life is a reference to the Pink Floyd-instrumental of the same name released in 1987.

The track "Seek You Out" has never been played live.

The booklet contains song lyrics as well as the special code to "elusive bonus" features on the band's official website, which include a remix of the song "Lift" and several wallpapers based on booklet artworks and the "Lift" video.

== Track listing ==
All tracks are written by Markus Kaarlonen, Marko Saaresto and Olli Tukiainen

| No. | Title | Length |
|---|---|---|
| 1. | "Lift" | 5:11 |
| 2. | "Overboard" | 4:43 |
| 3. | "Late Goodbye" | 3:46 |
| 4. | "Don't Mess with Me" | 3:58 |
| 5. | "3 AM" | 4:21 |
| 6. | "Stay" | 3:33 |
| 7. | "Seek You Out" | 3:46 |
| 8. | "Shallow" | 4:23 |
| 9. | "Everything Fades" | 3:08 |
| 10. | "Someone Special" | 4:18 |
| 11. | "Illusion & Dream" | 5:26 |
| 12. | "Sleep" | 4:59 |

== Release history ==
| Country | Release date | Notes |
|---|---|---|
| Finland | 19 January 2005 | |
| Denmark | August 2005 | |
| Norway | August 2005 | |
| Sweden | August 2005 | |
| Worldwide iTunes | 12 April 2008 | |
| Official webshop | 19 January 2011 | Limited edition vinyl |

== Singles ==
| Single | Release dates | Charts |
| Single | Finland | |
|---|---|---|
| "Late Goodbye" | 30 June 2004 | 14 |
| "Lift" | 9 September 2004 | 8 |

("Illusion & Dream" and "Stay" were also radio-only promo singles; they were not released as physical singles and no videos were made)

== Awards and nominations ==
=== Awards ===
| Year | Award | Title | Result |
|---|---|---|---|
| 2006 | Emma Award | Best Debut Album of the Year | Won |

=== Nominations ===
| Year | Award | Title | Rank |
|---|---|---|---|
| 2005 | Radio City | Album of the Year | #7 |
