= Alan Wake's American Nightmare =

2012 video game

- Developer: Remedy Entertainment (Note: Remedy co-developed the Microsoft Windows port with Nitro Games.)
- Publishers: Microsoft Studios; Remedy Entertainment (PC)
- Directors: Sam Lake; Kai Auvinen
- Writers: Mikko Rautalahti; Sam Lake
- Composer: Petri Alanko
- Platforms: Xbox 360; Windows
- Release: Xbox 360: WW: 22 February 2012; Windows: NA: 22 May 2012; EU: 29 June 2012; AU: 15 November 2012
- Genre: Third-person shooter
- Mode: Single-player

Alan Wake's American Nightmare is a 2012 third-person shooter video game developed by Remedy Entertainment and published by Microsoft Studios. It is a downloadable follow-up and spin-off to its predecessor, Alan Wake (2010). The game was released for Xbox 360 on 22 February 2012 worldwide. A Microsoft Windows version was released on 22 May 2012 in North America, 29 June 2012 in Europe and 15 November 2012 in Australia.

== Gameplay ==
Alan Wake's American Nightmare makes use of the same combat mechanics found in the original Alan Wake: Alan has a flashlight, which must be focused on enemies before firing weapons at them. American Nightmare is more battle-focused, containing more ammunition and a wider variety of weapons, including a machine gun, a nail gun, a crossbow, and combat shotguns, among others. Some weapons are unlocked via cases found throughout the maps, which each require a certain number of acquired manuscript pages to open. Collectible pages were also featured in the original Alan Wake, though they had only served to provide an additional story element.

The game also features an arcade mode, where Alan is set against increasingly difficult waves of enemies. New arcade maps are unlocked as they are successfully beaten, while available weapons are determined by the number of pages that have been recovered in story mode.

== Synopsis ==
=== Setting and characters ===
Alan Wake's American Nightmare revolves around the titular Alan Wake, a former bestselling author of crime fiction. During a vacation to the small town of Bright Falls, Washington, Alan encountered a supernatural entity known as the Dark Presence, which forced him to write the manuscript of a horror novel which would give it power by turning the events of the story into reality. This occurred through the power of the Dark Place, a subjective alternate dimension located beneath the volcanic Cauldron Lake near Bright Falls. Alan was ultimately able to defeat the Dark Presence by altering the ending of the manuscript, freeing Bright Falls and destroying the Dark Presence but trapping Alan within the Dark Place.

Alan Wake's American Nightmare focuses on Mr. Scratch, a doppelgänger of Alan created by the power of Cauldron Lake. During the events of the game, it is revealed that Mr. Scratch was created when false rumors spread of Alan following his disappearance; the power of the Dark Place turned this misinformation into reality in the form of Mr. Scratch, who thus represents a negative, purely evil version of Alan. Mr. Scratch serves an unknown entity from the Dark Place, and seeks to use its power to plunge the Earth into darkness. Alan seeks to defeat Mr. Scratch in order to protect humanity, particularly his wife, Alice Wake. Like the Dark Presence, Mr. Scratch has the power to possess human beings and turn them into "Taken," monstrosities which can only be killed when light is shone on them.

The game takes place in Night Springs, a fictional town brought to life by Alan's writings. Within the town, Alan encounters several denizens who aid him in his mission to stop Mr. Scratch, including auto mechanic Emma Sloan, astronomer Dr. Rachel Meadows, and art curator Serena Valdivia. Other characters who make cameos in the game include Alan's friend and agent Barry Wheeler, and the Anderson brothers, heavy metal musicians from Bright Falls who aided Alan during the events of the first game, whom Barry now manages during their comeback tour.

=== Plot ===
The plot of American Nightmare is framed by the narration of an episode of the fictional TV show, Night Springs, which follows the style of The Twilight Zone and appeared on television screens throughout the original Alan Wake. The episode is displayed on a TV screen in the hotel room of Barry Wheeler, Alan's friend and former agent. The narration explains that Alan is attempting to chase down the "herald of darkness", Mr. Scratch, who is Alan's evil doppelganger created by a dark force. Scratch is determined to take away everything Alan loves, including his wife, Alice. Alan, as the "champion of light," has the ability to rewrite reality, and was able to write his escape from Cauldron Lake in Washington. He ends up near the small town of Night Springs, Arizona, and learns that he has been missing from the real world for nearly two years.

A nearby oil derrick erupts with hordes of Taken controlled by Mr. Scratch. Seeking light, Alan runs to a nearby motel, where he encounters Emma Sloan, who at first thinks he is Mr. Scratch, since they look identical. She tells Alan that Scratch was at the motel the night before, and provides Alan with a typewritten page, a way to alter reality to destroy the derrick and stop the Taken. Alan follows its instructions and alters the scene by the oil derrick, which causes a meteor to collide with an artificial satellite, sending it hurtling towards the Earth, where it then collides with the oil derrick. While Alan is away performing this task, the dark forces consume Emma.

Following clues he found at the motel, along with a set of keys, Alan heads to a nearby observatory. There, Dr. Rachel Meadows, who also met Mr. Scratch previously, is tracking a mysterious signal sent just before the satellite was knocked out of orbit. Rachel tells Alan that Mr. Scratch was very interested in this signal, and Alan surmises that it must contain the key to defeating him. Before they can acquire the complete signal, the observatory's telescope is sabotaged by the Taken. After Alan repairs the damage, a portion of the signal comes through that translates into a page of a story: a new reality that Alan can presumably implement.

The page points Alan to a nearby drive-in theater, where he meets Serena Valdivia, who is under the influence of the darkness. After freeing her by restoring power and switching the lights on, Serena tells Alan that Mr. Scratch is trying to prevent the sun from ever rising again. She gives Alan the security code to the projection room where he can change reality. Alan uses the incomplete message to try to set the new reality; however, as the message is only partial, the new reality does not take effect. Mr. Scratch appears, gloating, and sends Alan back in time to a few hours before. Alan realizes that Mr. Scratch intends to keep Alan trapped in the time loop forever, until he is finally killed and Mr. Scratch will be free to take over the world.

Waking up again near the motel, Alan repeats many of the same motions. Emma and Rachel still have some deja vu of the previous loop's events, and have helped perform some of Alan's previous tasks for him. Despite his efforts to change events this time around, Emma is nevertheless consumed again by the darkness. Rachel is able to capture a longer portion of the signal this time, but it is still incomplete. When Alan returns to the drive-in theater, he is still unable to complete the new reality and is sent back in time again by Mr. Scratch.

Alan repeats his actions for a third time, but this time, he is able to save Emma and gain the complete message from Rachel. He sets the correct series of events in the projection room, which triggers the projector to show a film made by Alice. Mr. Scratch appears again, but discovers that Alan has successfully written the new reality, and he is burned out of existence by the film. On the screen, Alan appears to reunite with Alice along a sun-lit shoreline; however, the narrator challenges whether these events actually occurred, or were merely a figment of Alan's imagination.

In a post-credits scene, Barry wakes up suddenly, believing he has heard Alan's voice.

== Development ==
On 9 May 2011, a sequel game was hinted at when "Alan Wake 2" was shown on Althea Suarez Gata's curriculum vitae. On the same day, the information was removed from her curriculum vitae.

On 10 May 2011, Oskari Häkkinen from Remedy told Joystiq, who had leaked an announcement rumor, that the official announcement of this installment was coming. He stressed that it would not be considered "Alan Wake 2", but neither would it be mere add-on content.

Spike Video Game Awards 2011 showed a new trailer for the game on 10 December 2011. It had been speculated that the game would be an Xbox 360 game named "Alan Wake's Night Springs". The first image for the game was released by GameInformer on 7 November 2011. Just before the Video Game Awards, IGN released a screenshot of the game, along with the official title.

Following rumors that the game would be released for Microsoft Windows, Remedy announced in early May 2012 that the game would be available for the platform on 22 May 2012. This followed Remedy's port of the original Alan Wake to the Windows platform a few months earlier.

=== Soundtrack ===
Petri Alanko, the composer from the first game, returned to score American Nightmare. Licensed music includes the song "Club Foot" by British indie rock band Kasabian, which plays a pivotal role in the game's narrative. Poets of the Fall also composed two new songs: "The Happy Song", which is featured whenever Mr. Scratch appears, and "Balance Slays the Demon", which appears under the fictional band "Old Gods of Asgard".

== Reception ==
Reception

Aggregate score
Aggregator	Score
Metacritic	X360: 76/100; PC: 73/100

Review scores
Publication	Score
1Up.com	B
Eurogamer	7/10
G4	4/5
GameSpot	7/10
GamesRadar+	8/10
GameTrailers	8/10
IGN	8/10
Joystiq	4/5
Official Xbox Magazine (US)	8.5/10
VideoGamer.com	8/10
UGO	B

Alan Wake's American Nightmare received "generally favorable" reviews from critics for the Xbox 360 version, while the PC version received "mixed or average" reviews, according to review aggregator website Metacritic.

IGN scored the game an 8/10, praising its production and action elements, but criticizes the sub-par story, the oddly written dialogue, and lack of suspense. In the first week of release, the game was the top-selling Arcade game on Xbox Live. 1Up.com gave the game a B, saying, "It's not Alan Wake 2, nor is it a proper episode; it's just Alan Wake's solid shooting married to an even-odder-than-usual story."

== Sequel ==
Remedy Entertainment stated that this was not the last Alan Wake game, and that a sequel was in development. In May 2013, Remedy confirmed they were not currently developing a new Alan Wake, instead focusing on a new game for the Xbox One called Quantum Break. Alan Wake II was announced during The Game Awards 2021, and released in October 2023. Alan Wake II expands upon Remedy's connected universe it shares with Control, also by Remedy.
