= Poets of the Fall =

Finnish rock band

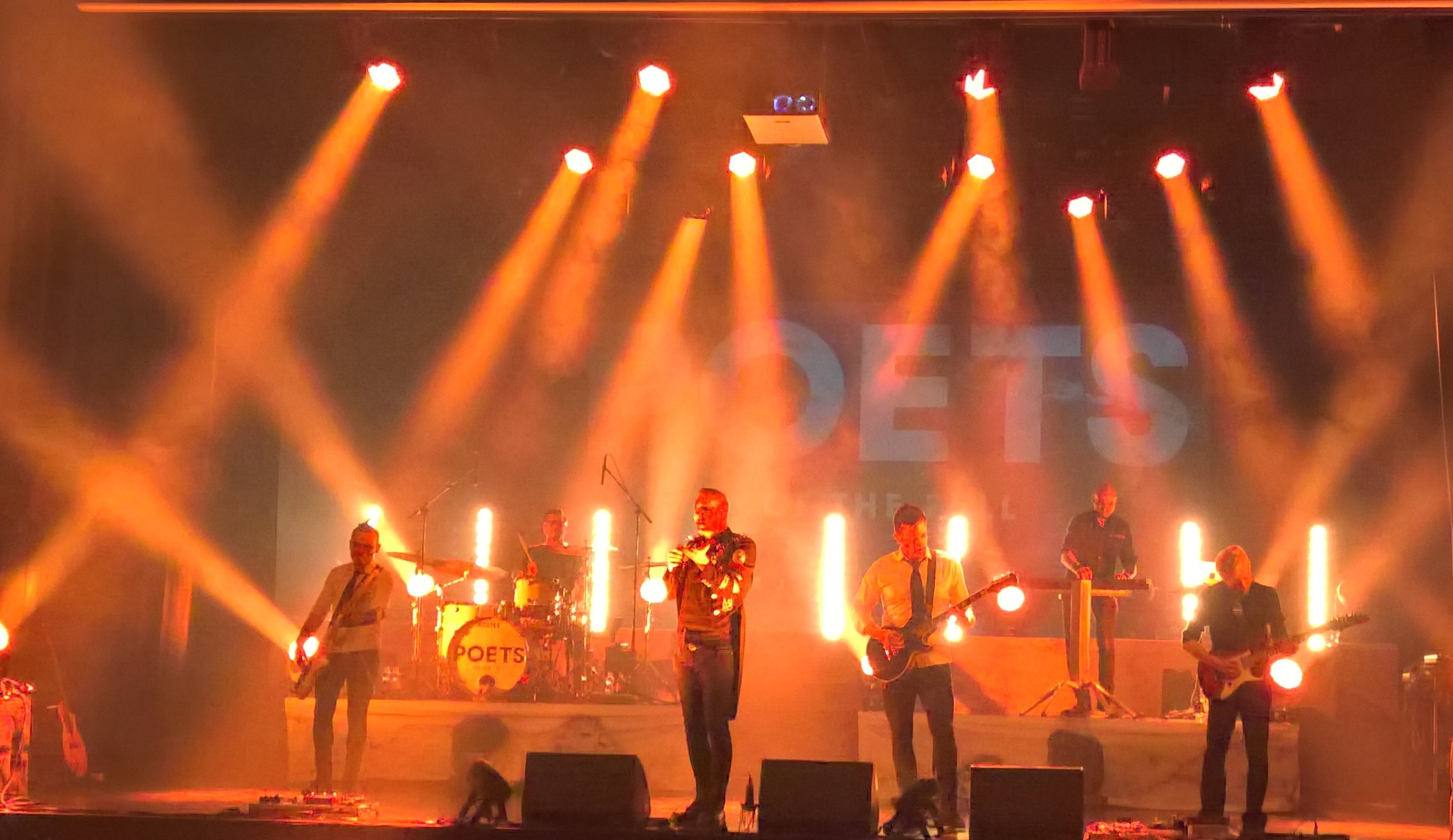
- Poets of the Fall performing at Savoy-teatteri, Helsinki, Finland in December 2017

Background information
- Also known as: Old Gods of Asgard
- Origin: Helsinki, Finland
- Genres: Alternative rock; post-grunge; symphonic rock
- Years active: 2003–present
- Labels: Insomniac, Remote Music
- Members: Markus Kaarlonen; Marko Saaresto; Olli Tukiainen; Jani Snellman; Jaska Mäkinen; Jari Salminen
- Past members: Tapio Sutela
- Website: poetsofthefall.com

Poets of the Fall (POTF) is a Finnish rock band from Helsinki. The group consists of Marko Saaresto (lead vocals), Olli Tukiainen (lead guitar), Markus "Captain" Kaarlonen (keyboards, production), Jani Snellman (bass), Jaska Mäkinen (rhythm guitar), and Jari Salminen (drums, percussion).

The band is known for their partnership with video game developers, most notably with Remedy Entertainment, having written songs for Max Payne 2: The Fall of Max Payne (2003), Alan Wake (2010), Alan Wake's American Nightmare (2012), Control (2019), and Alan Wake 2 (2023), the latter four in a much heavier style and under the pseudonym Old Gods of Asgard.

== History ==
=== 2003–2005: Formation and Signs of Life ===
The band was founded on 25 April 2003 by Saaresto and Tukiainen. Tukiainen had written multiple songs for Saaresto's previous band Fuss and performed with Finnish jazzband Pohjoinen Syke previously.

In 2003, Saaresto's friend Sami Järvi, a script-writer working at Remedy Entertainment handed Saaresto a poem he had written, asking him to turn it into a song to use in Remedy's video game Max Payne 2: The Fall of Max Payne. The song, entitled "Late Goodbye", was used as the ending-theme of the game as well as a recurring motif, being sung and whistled by multiple characters. It was produced by Markus "Captain" Kaarlonen, who joined the band shortly after due to Saaresto and Tukiainen admiring his work. In order to have creative freedom and full control over the band, the members founded their own independent record label, Insomniac, which they have been releasing all their albums through ever since.

On 30 June 2004, Poets released their debut single "Late Goodbye" in Finland which was followed by "Lift" on 9 September 2004. The music videos for both songs were directed by Tuomas "Stobe" Harju. The songs charted #14 and #8 on the Finnish single charts and reached #2 and #7 in YleX's 2004-voting for "Best Finnish song". POTF were also voted "Fresh Newcomer of 2004" by YleX.

On 18 December 2004, the band released a song "Maybe Tomorrow is a Better Day" as a free download on their website to promote their then-upcoming debut album Signs of Life. The album was released on 19 January 2005 in Finland, followed by an iTunes release on 25 May 2005. It entered the Finnish Top 40 album chart at #1 and has been certified platinum by the Finnish IFPI. It won the Emma Award for the "Best Debut Album of the Year 2005" with the band also receiving the "Best Newcomer of the Year" award. The songs "Stay" and "Illusion and Dream" were used as promotional radio singles. Due to Kaarlonen being a former employee of benchmark-developer Futuremark, POTF were offered to have their song "Lift" included in the 2005-iteration of Futuremark's benchmarking software 3DMark, which helped further promote the album. In 2005 POTF performed at Popkomm in Berlin.

=== 2006–2009: Carnival of Rust and Revolution Roulette ===
Having won the NRJ Radio Awards' "Best Finnish Breakthrough", POTF released their third single, "Carnival of Rust", on 22 March 2006 in Finland and on 1 December 2006 in Germany. The single entered the Finnish charts at #2 and features a radio- and an album-edit as well as a live-recording of "Don't Mess With Me", the fourth track on Signs of Life, from the band's performance at Rockperry Festival, Vaasa, Finland on 15 July 2005. On 30 March 2006, the band released the music video for "Carnival of Rust" which shows a gas-masked woman visiting an old carnival, and also references every song from the band's second album of the same name. The video became hugely popular in Finland, winning two Muuvi Awards and the YLE Audience Choice Award as "Best Finnish Music Video of All Time". It was also voted "Best Music Video 2006" by The Voice. In 2009, it was remastered by Elmeri Raitanen as his bachelor-thesis in visual and media arts at Lahti Institute of Design and reissued in HD.

On 12 April 2006, Poets' second album Carnival of Rust was released in Finland, and later in Sweden, Australia, Ukraine, Russia, Germany, and on iTunes. It includes 11 new songs, a remastered version of "Maybe Tomorrow is a Better Day", as well as the music video for the title track. The cover, which sees the return of the lollipop from the first album, was designed by Tuomas Harju. Carnival of Rust also went straight to #1 on the Finnish charts. It has been certified platinum. It was selected as one of the best albums 2006 by Finland's largest newspaper, Helsingin Sanomat, and was nominated for NRJ Radio Awards' "Best Finnish Album" and Emma Awards' "Best Rock Album" in 2007.

In 2008, POTF redesigned their moth-logo and also changed the font used to display their band name. They also participated in the Voice's CD compilation Livenä Vieraissa, with a cover version of Chris Cornell's song "You Know My Name", and their own song "Diamonds for Tears". The same year, POTF signed Phoenix Effect, the band of former Sunrise Avenue-guitarist Janne Kärkkäinen to their label, Insomniac, and produced their debut album Cyanide Skies with Saaresto / Tukiainen performing additional vocals and guitar work. The album was released on 18 February 2009 in Finland and entered the Finnish album charts at #22. POTF also make a cameo-appearance in the video to Phoenix Effect's song "King See No Evil".

Poets of the Fall released their next single called "The Ultimate Fling" in Finland on 6 February 2008. It features three variations of the title track (a radio-edit, an album-edit and an impromptu-version) as well as a live recording of "Fire", the opening track of the band's second album Carnival of Rust which was recorded during the Poets' performance at Ankkarock Festival 2007 on 5 August. The single charted at #2 in the Finnish singles chart. Months after the release of the single, the band published the accompanying video which consists of fan-recorded footage of the band performing at various gigs.

The band's third album, Revolution Roulette, was released in Finland and on iTunes on 26 March 2008. Its cover was designed by Tuomas Harju and features a giant padlock with a built-in roulette, abandoning the lollipop used on the previous album-covers. The record marks the first POTF-album not produced in Markus Kaarlonen's living-room, but the band's own professional studio. It went straight to the top of the Finnish charts and was certified gold two weeks after being released. The album's title track was also released as a promotional radio single. Revolution Roulette is currently the only POTF album that has not been released physically outside Finland. While on tour with the album, the band played their first gig in the United States at Musexpo 2008 in Los Angeles on 29 April. On 18 September 2009, the band released a "Best of"-compilation in India.

In mid-2009, after finishing the Revolution Roulette Tour, POTF announced they would be heading into the studio to record their fourth album, the genre of which they described as "cinematic rock". On 9 December 2009, the band announced a song "War" from their fourth studio album would be featured in a psychological thriller video game Alan Wake developed by Remedy Entertainment. Along with "War", Alan Wake also features two new songs, "Children of the Elder God" and "The Poet and The Muse", which were written specifically for the game and performed by Poets of the Fall as the in-game band Old Gods of Asgard. In June 2010, the band released a video for "War" (despite it being only a promotional radio single) which reenacts scenes from the game in live-action. It features Finnish actor Ilkka Villi as the game's protagonist of the same name (Villi also served as the model used for the creation of the Alan Wake character) and the band, except Saaresto. In the video, the band portrays some of Alan Wake's in-game antagonists, lumberjacks possessed by an evil force named "the Dark Presence", collectively called "the Taken".

=== 2010–2014: Twilight Theater, Temple of Thought and Jealous Gods ===
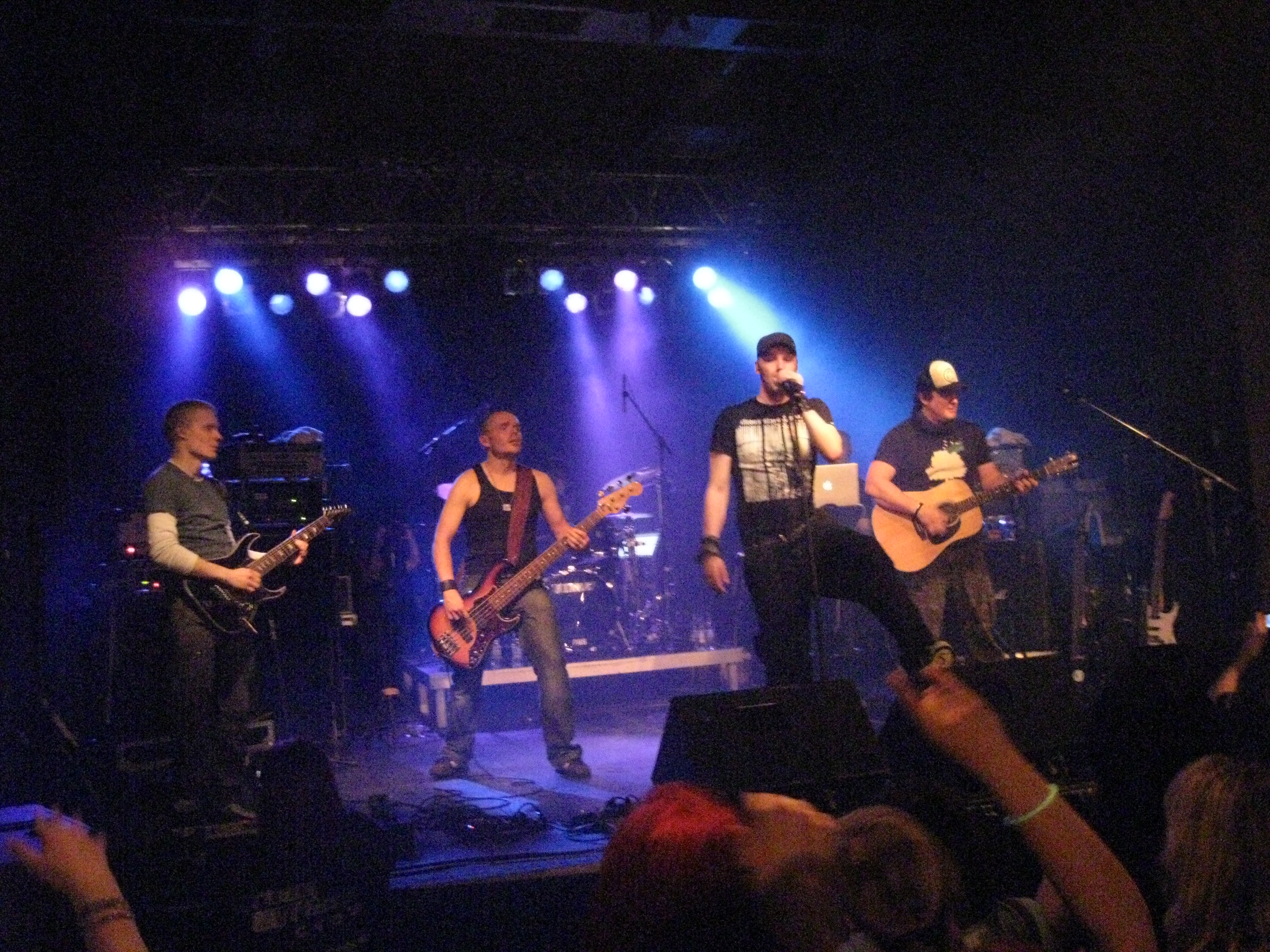
Poets of The Fall performing at Columbia Club in Berlin on 24 April 2008 – left to right: Tukiainen, Snellman, Saaresto, Mäkinen

On 21 January 2010, "Dreaming Wide Awake", the first single off the band's fourth album, Twilight Theater, debuted on Radio NRJ Suomi on 21 January and was released on 3 February as a limited-edition single. It reached #18 on the Finnish singles chart. Twilight Theater was released in Finland and on iTunes on 17 March, followed by Germany, Austria and Switzerland on 29 October. It went straight to #1 of the Finnish album charts and was certified gold a week after release.

A double-vinyl edition of the band's debut album Signs of Life was released on 19 January 2011, exactly six years after its original release. A CD & DVD-compilation entitled Alchemy Vol.1 was released on 16 March 2011. It contains the band's whole videography as well as the favourite songs of the band-members and also features two new songs, "No End, No Beginning" and "Can You Hear Me". The latter was released digitally on 2 February 2011, and is featured in the remake of Remedy Entertainment's video game Death Rally. The music video for the song was directed by Mikko Harma and premiered on The Voice on 18 March 2011.

On 24 January 2012, the lead single off the new album, "Cradled in Love", was released for Finnish radio airplay, and on 26 January - for digital download on the band's official digistore. "Cradled in Love" music video was released on 3 March 2012.

The band's fifth studio album, Temple of Thought, was released on 21 March 2012, and debuted at #3 on the Finnish charts. Alternate versions of "Kamikaze Love" and "The Lie Eternal" were released as singles on 13 April 2012 and 6 July 2012, respectively, in Finland via Insomniac and in Germany via Remote Music. A special edition of the album featuring three bonus tracks was released in Germany and internationally (digital-only) on 20 July 2012. "The Happy Song", an original song written for Alan Wake's American Nightmare, also appeared on the album and was released as a single. The Temple of Thought Tour included locations in Finland, Russia, Germany, Romania and India.

The band filmed their show in Moscow on 13 March 2013, during their 10th Anniversary Tour, and released it on 13 September 2013, as their first live DVD titled Live in Moscow. The production of the release was crowdfunded via PledgeMusic.

On 8 July 2014, the band announced their sixth studio album Jealous Gods would be released on 19 September on all digital music retailers, streaming services and selected record stores. Its first single, "Daze", was released on 22 August on their official website along with a music video. Additionally, prior to the album's release, and as a countdown to the new single and video, each Friday, starting from 11 July with Signs of Life, the band released each of their albums on Spotify in chronological order. In October 2014, the band began the Jealous Gods Tour in Finland and Germany.

=== 2015–present: Clearview, Ultraviolet and Ghostlight ===
On 11 June 2015, the band announced that they had begun working on the next album. In January 2016, POTF announced they would be working with Kent producer Stefan Boman on the album. On 4 August 2016, the album's first single, "Drama for Life", was released. The band's seventh studio album, Clearview, was released on 30 September 2016, coinciding with the start of the Clearview Tour in Helsinki.

On 11 March 2018, the band announced that their eighth album would be released in October 2018. On 5 October 2018, Poets released their eighth album Ultraviolet, which once again hit the #1 position on the Finnish album chart. Two singles, "False Kings" and "Dancing on Broken Glass", accompanied with music videos, were released prior to the album. On 27 August 2019, the band released (under their Remedy alter-ego Old Gods of Asgard) a single "Take Control" written especially for the video game Control, which also featured Ultraviolet's single "My Dark Disquiet".

With the release of an unplugged version of "King of Fools" on 15 January 2020, Poets started a monthly series of acoustic singles and videos recorded at the Alexander Theatre which resulted into the release of the Alexander Theatre Sessions on 11 December 2020.

On 15 March 2021, the band released "Stay Forever"—an updated version of a song from their debut album Signs of Life, which includes elements added to the live version of the song since the original release—as a digital single with a music video directed by Miika Hakala.

On 13 March 2022, Poets of the Fall announced their album Ghostlight, released on 29 April 2022, as a completion to the band's third trilogy, consisting of Clearview, Ultraviolet and Ghostlight. According to the band, Ghostlight embodies the idea of metamorphosis, winning over hardship, of acceptance and becoming whole. The only single and music video released for the album was "Requiem for My Harlequin".

On 18 April 2023, the band formally announced their 20th Anniversary Tour and released its European dates outside Finland.

On 15 November 2023, Old Gods of Asgard released a single titled "Herald of Darkness", written especially for Alan Wake 2 and featuring in-game characters' Alan Wake and Mr. Door's voice actors (Matthew Porretta and David Harewood), accompanied by a music video featuring the voice actors and Alan Wake's face actor (Ilkka Villi). On 8 December 2023, the band released Old Gods of Asgard's Rebirth – Greatest Hits, a compilation album composed of nine songs written for Remedy Entertainment games. On the same day, Old Gods of Asgard debuted live at The Game Awards 2023 performing "Herald of Darkness" together with Ilkka Villi, Matthew Porretta, David Harewood and Sam Lake. The album hit #1 position on the Finnish album chart and peaked #4 at Worldwide iTunes Album Chart after The Game Awards.

On 24 November 2025, in honour of Carnival of Rusts upcoming 20th anniversary, a special live show at Allas Live in Helsinki was announced for 4 September 2026, dubbed Carnival by the Sea. The remaining tour dates across Finland and Europe were finalized and confirmed on 16 April 2026.

== Members ==
- Marko Saaresto – lead vocals (2003–present; Odin Anderson in Old Gods of Asgard)
- Olli Tukiainen – lead guitar (2003–present; Bob Balder in Old Gods of Asgard)
- Markus "Captain" Kaarlonen – keyboards, production (2003–present; Tor Anderson in Old Gods of Asgard)
- Jani Snellman – bass guitar (2008–present; 2005–2008 touring)
- Jaakko "Jaska" Mäkinen – rhythm guitar (2008–present; 2005–2008 touring)
- Jari Salminen – drums, percussion (2008–present; 2006–2008 touring)

Touring members

- Tuomas Rauhala – drums (2019, 2022–2023)
- Tapio Sutela – drums, percussion (2004–2006)

== Discography ==
- Signs of Life (2005)
- Carnival of Rust (2006)
- Revolution Roulette (2008)
- Twilight Theater (2010)
- Temple of Thought (2012)
- Jealous Gods (2014)
- Clearview (2016)
- Ultraviolet (2018)
- Ghostlight (2022)

== Tours ==
Years	Tour	Countries	Concerts	Ref.
2004–2005	Signs of Life Tour	5 (Denmark, Finland, Germany, Norway, Sweden)	62	
2006–2007	Carnival of Rust Tour	8 (Denmark, Estonia, Finland, Germany, India, Lithuania, Russia, Sweden)	126	
2008–2009	Revolution Roulette Tour	5 (Finland, Germany, Russia, Sweden, United States)	59	
2010	Twilight Theater Tour	3 (Finland, Germany, Russia)	24	
2011	Alchemy Tour	4 (Finland, India, Russia, Ukraine)	15	
2012–2013	Temple of Thought Tour	9 (Austria, Estonia, Finland, Germany, India, Romania, Russia, Switzerland, Ukraine)	74	
2014–2015	Jealous Gods Tour	9 (Belarus, Finland, Germany, India, Italy, Netherlands, Russia, Ukraine, United Kingdom)	69	
2016–2017	Clearview Tour	9 (Belarus, Finland, Germany, India, Italy, Netherlands, Russia, Ukraine, United Kingdom)	35	
2018–2019	Ultraviolet Tour	21 (Austria, Czech Republic, Estonia, Finland, France, Germany, Hungary, India, Ireland, Italy, Luxembourg, Netherlands, Norway, Poland, Portugal, Russia, Spain, Sweden, Ukraine, United Kingdom, United States)	53	
2022–2023	Ghostlight Tour	12 (Austria, Czech Republic, Denmark, Finland, France, Germany, Hungary, Ireland, Luxembourg, Netherlands, Poland, United Kingdom)	28	
2023	20th Anniversary Tour	10 (Finland, Czech Republic, Hungary, Poland, Germany, Netherlands, Denmark, Sweden, France, United Kingdom)	20	
2026	Echoes of the Carnaval Tour	4 (Finland, Germany, Netherlands, United Kingdom)	15	

== Awards ==
Year	Award	Category	Related work	Result	Ref.
2004	Game Audio Network Guild Awards	Best Original Vocal Song – Pop	Late Goodbye	Won	
2004	YleX's "Best of 2004"	Best Finnish Newcomer	Themselves	Won	
2004	YleX's "Best of 2004"	Best Finnish Song	Lift	2nd place	
2004	YleX's "Best of 2004"	Best Finnish Song	Late Goodbye	7th place	
2005	Musiikki & Media Events	Newcomer of '05	Themselves	Won	
2005	Radio City	Album of the Year	Signs of Life	7th place	
2005	The Voice	Top 106	Lift	10th place	
2006	NRJ Radio Awards	Best Finnish Breakthrough 2005	Themselves	Won	
2006	Emma Awards	Best Newcomer of the Year	Themselves	Won	
2006	Emma Awards	Best Debut Album of the Year	Signs of Life	Won	
2006	MTV Europe Music Awards	Best Finnish Act	Themselves	Won	
2006	The Voice	Best Music Video 2006	Carnival of Rust	Won	
2006	The Voice	Best Music Video 2006	Locking Up the Sun	12th place	
2006	YLE Audience Choice Award	Best Finnish Music Video of All Time	Carnival of Rust	Won	
2007	NRJ Radio Awards	Best Finnish Band	Themselves	Won	
2007	NRJ Radio Awards	Best Nordic Band	Themselves	Nominated	
2007	NRJ Radio Awards	Best Finnish Album	Carnival of Rust	Nominated	
2007	Muuvi Awards	Bronze Muuvi Award	Carnival of Rust	Won	
2007	Muuvi Awards	Muuvi People's Choice Award	Carnival of Rust	Won	
2007	Emma Awards	Best Rock Album	Carnival of Rust	Nominated	
2007	Helsingin Sanomat	Most Beloved Finnish Rock Song	Late Goodbye	Nominated	
2011	Emma Awards	Best Music Video	War	Nominated	
2024	The National Academy of Video Game Trade Reviewers Awards	Best Original or Adapted Song	Alan Wake 2 - Herald of Darkness	Won	

== In other media ==
Song	Featured in	Type of media	Annotations
Late Goodbye	Max Payne 2: The Fall of Max Payne	Video game (PS2, Win, Xbox)	Serves as the ending theme of the game and was written specifically for it. It is sung, whistled and even performed on piano by multiple characters throughout the game.
Lift	3DMark 05	Benchmarking software	The song is credited as "Lift Me Higher".
Locking up the Sun	Heroes	TV series	Advertisements of the show in Finland.
Carnival of Rust	Suden vuosi (The Year of the Wolf)	Movie	
Themselves	Phoenix Effect – King See No Evil	Music video	
War	Alan Wake	Video game (Xbox 360, Win)	Ending theme of episode five (The Clicker). During the episode, it is played by Pat Maine on his radio show during a combat sequence in a warehouse. The song is also included on the in-game soundtrack.
Children of the Elder God	Alan Wake	Video game (Xbox 360, Win)	POTF are credited as the fictional in-game band Old Gods of Asgard. The song was written specifically for the game and can be heard during a combat sequence taking place during episode four (The Truth), as well as during the beginning of the second downloadable-content-episode The Writer. In the latter, the song's guitars and vocals are edited to sound off key. The original version of the song is included on the in-game soundtrack.
The Poet and the Muse	Alan Wake	Video game (Xbox 360, Win)	Also performed as Old Gods of Asgard, it serves as the ending theme to episode four (The Truth), and is included in-game, as well as on the Limited-Edition Soundtrack. The lyrics of the song detail the backstory for the game, including the mystical Cauldron Lake, the death of Thomas Zane's wife, his attempts to bring her back using the lake's seemingly magical properties, her resurrected form being corrupted by a dark presence, and his efforts to reseal the dark presence beneath the lake along with himself. The lyrics also contain a message for Alan Wake with instructions on how to defeat the dark presence and save his wife from captivity.
Late Goodbye	Alan Wake	Video game (Xbox 360, Win)	Referenced in the manuscript page The Sudden Stop 2 at the beginning of episode two (Taken).
Themselves	Alan Wake	Video game (Xbox 360, Win)	The band can be seen briefly on the Harry Garrett Show which can be watched by turning on the television in Alan Wake's flat at the beginning of episode six (Departure).
Can You Hear Me	Death Rally	Video game (iPhone, iPad, Win)	End credits theme
Grinder's Blues	Rochard	Video game (PSN, Win, Linux)	
Balance Slays the Demon	Alan Wake's American Nightmare	Video game (Win, XBLA)	With the band credited as Old Gods of Asgard, the song can be heard in Act 1, Part 3 in the drive-in's back office on a radio, as well as playing during a fight sequence in Act 3, Part 2.
The Happy Song	Alan Wake's American Nightmare	Video game (Win, XBLA)	Plays whenever Mr. Scratch appears.
Dors mon ange	Personne d'autre	Françoise Hardy Cover song "Dors mon Ange"	Cover song of "Sleep" which was the main reason for creating the album.
Take Control	Control	Video game (PS4, Win, XB1)	With the band credited as Old Gods of Asgard, the song can be heard in the Ashtray Maze sequence.
My Dark Disquiet	Control	Video game (PS4, Win, XB1)	Plays in a soundproofed room, with an associated questionnaire collectable.
Herald of Darkness	Alan Wake 2	Video game (PS5, Win, Xbox Series X/S)	Features Ilkka Villi, Matthew Porretta, and David Harewood. Credited as the Old Gods of Asgard, the band performs the song in live-action as the house band for the in-universe talk show In Between with Mr. Door during a musical segment in Initiation 4: We Sing.
Anger's Remorse	Alan Wake 2	Video game (PS5, Win, Xbox Series X/S)	Credited as the Old Gods of Asgard, this song becomes a plot point in the Return 5: Old Gods chapter. Created as an apology from the Old Gods to Saga Anderson and her mother, the song can be heard near the end of the chapter.
Dark Ocean Summoning	Alan Wake 2	Video game (PS5, Win, Xbox Series X/S)	Credited as the Old Gods of Asgard, this song can be heard in Return 7: Summoning during a combat sequence. Saga Anderson tries to use the song and the reality-changing powers of Cauldron Lake to "summon" Alan Wake back into reality.
Take Control	Alan Wake 2	Video game (PS5, Win, Xbox Series X/S)	Credited as the Old Gods of Asgard, these songs return from previous games as tracks that can be unlocked after the Anger's Remorse storyline in Return 5: Old Gods is completed.
Balance Slays the Demon	Alan Wake 2	Video game (PS5, Win, Xbox Series X/S)	Credited as the Old Gods of Asgard, these songs return from previous games as tracks that can be unlocked after the Anger's Remorse storyline in Return 5: Old Gods is completed.
Children of the Elder God	Alan Wake 2	Video game (PS5, Win, Xbox Series X/S)	Credited as the Old Gods of Asgard, these songs return from previous games as tracks that can be unlocked after the Anger's Remorse storyline in Return 5: Old Gods is completed.
The Poet and the Muse	Alan Wake 2	Video game (PS5, Win, Xbox Series X/S)	Credited as the Old Gods of Asgard, these songs return from previous games as tracks that can be unlocked after the Anger's Remorse storyline in Return 5: Old Gods is completed.
Heroes and Villains	Alan Wake 2	Video game (PS5, Win, Xbox Series X/S)	This song is played during the end-credits.

Preceded by The Rasmus	Best Finnish Act 2006; MTV Europe Music Awards	Succeeded by Negative
