= Twilight Theater =

Studio album by Poets of the Fall
- Released: 17 March 2010
- Genre: Alternative rock, symphonic rock
- Length: 46:16
- Label: Insomniac
- Producer: Poets of the Fall

Poets of the Fall chronology
Revolution Roulette (2008)	Twilight Theater (2010)	Alchemy Vol.1 (2011)

Singles from Twilight Theater
- 1. "Dreaming Wide Awake" Released: 3 February 2010; 2. "War" Released: 16 February 2012

Professional ratings
Review scores
Source	Rating
Tempelores.com	(Favourable)
Venia-mag.net	(90/100)
Sputnikmusic.com	4/5

Twilight Theater is the fourth studio album by the Finnish rock band Poets of the Fall. It was released in Finland as well as on iTunes on 17 March 2010 and was released in Germany, Austria and Switzerland on 29 October. The record went gold in its first week after jumping to #1 on the Finnish album charts.

The title of the album comes from the song "Given and Denied".

The song "War" was featured in 2010 video game Alan Wake and released as part of Steam Collector's Edition soundtrack on 2 March 2012. It was released as a single on 16 February.

== Track listing ==
All tracks are written by Poets of the Fall.

No.	Title	Length
1.	"Dreaming Wide Awake"	4:23
2.	"War"	5:06
3.	"Change"	4:46
4.	"15 Min Flame"	5:00
5.	"Given and Denied"	4:17
6.	"Rewind"	4:22
7.	"Dying to Live"	3:46
8.	"You're Still Here"	3:27
9.	"Smoke and Mirrors"	5:17
10.	"Heal My Wounds"	5:56
Total length:		46:16

== Release history ==
Country	Release date
Finland	17 March 2010
iTunes worldwide	17 March 2010
Germany	29 October 2010
Austria	29 October 2010
America	29 October 2010

== Singles ==
Single	Release date	Charts
Dreaming Wide Awake	3 February 2010 (Finland) 10 February 2010 (iTunes)	#18 (Finland)
War	16 February 2012 (iTunes)	—

== Trivia ==
- The track War is featured in the video game Alan Wake
- The track 15 Minute Flame was partly inspired by the movie The Sixth Sense starring Bruce Willis
- The album is the first the band considers to feature "cinematic rock" instead of "alternative rock" on the previous three albums
- The harlequin on the cover is based on a photo showing the band's vocalist Marko Saaresto
- The ticket on the album-cover contains the original release date of the album as well as a sequence of numbers that translates into Hamartia
