= Temple of Thought =

Studio album by Poets of the Fall
- Released: 21 March 2012; 17 July 2015 (vinyl edition)
- Genre: Alternative rock
- Length: 48:43
- Label: Insomniac, Remote Music
- Producer: Poets of the Fall

Poets of the Fall chronology
Alchemy Vol.1 (2011)	Temple of Thought (2012)	Jealous Gods (2014)

Singles from Temple of Thought
- 1. "Cradled in Love" Released: 26 January 2012; 2. "The Happy Song" Released: 22 February 2012; 3. "Kamikaze Love (Germany only)" Released: 13 April 2012; 4. "The Lie Eternal (Germany only)" Released: 6 July 2012

Temple of Thought is the fifth studio album by the Finnish rock band Poets of the Fall. It was released in Finland on 17 March 2012. A bonus edition was released in Germany on 20 July 2012. The album entered the Finnish charts at number 3.

== Track listing ==
All tracks are written by Poets of the Fall

No.	Title	Length
1.	"Running Out of Time"	3:11
2.	"Temple of Thought"	4:36
3.	"Cradled in Love"	4:42
4.	"Kamikaze Love"	3:39
5.	"The Lie Eternal"	4:32
6.	"Skin"	4:27
7.	"The Distance"	5:04
8.	"Show Me This Life"	4:27
9.	"Morning Tide"	4:39
10.	"The Ballad of Jeremiah Peacekeeper"	5:05
11.	"The Happy Song"	4:19

Bonus edition

No.	Title	Length
12.	"Temple of thought (Unplugged Studio Live)"	4:33
13.	"Skin (Unplugged Studio Live)"	4:25
14.	"Signs of Life"	5:24

== Release history ==
Country	Release date
Finland	21 March 2012
Germany*	20 July 2012
India*	3 August 2012

"*"= Bonus edition

The album was released on limited edition vinyl of 1,000 copies in gatefold cover on 17 July 2015 by soundsUP records. For this release, the audio was completely remastered from source material and the layout design altered with tarot card theme. A collector's edition on transparent vinyl (300 copies) has a 3D popup of four cards in the center and the regular edition (700 copies) has an in insert with the band photo.

== Singles ==
Single	Release date
Kamikaze Love	13 April 2012 (Germany)
The Lie Eternal	6 July 2012 (Germany)
