= Jealous Gods =

Studio album by Poets of the Fall
- Released: 19 September 2014
- Genre: Alternative rock
- Length: 50:20
- Label: Insomniac
- Producer: Poets of the Fall

Poets of the Fall chronology
Temple of Thought (2012)	Jealous Gods (2014)	Clearview (2016)

Singles from Jealous Gods
- 1. "Daze" Released: 22 August 2014; 2. "Love Will Come to You" Released: 23 January 2015; 3. "Choice Millionaire" Released: 17 August 2015

Professional ratings
Review scores
Source	Rating
Tempelores.com	favourable

Jealous Gods is the sixth studio album by the Finnish rock band Poets of the Fall. It was released on 19 September 2014. The record debuted at number one on the Finnish Top 40 album chart.

== Track listing ==
All tracks are written by Poets of the Fall

No.	Title	Length
1.	"Daze"	5:26
2.	"Jealous Gods"	4:37
3.	"Rumors"	5:00
4.	"Brighter Than the Sun"	4:17
5.	"Love Will Come to You"	4:18
6.	"Rogue"	4:26
7.	"Rebirth"	4:18
8.	"Hounds to Hamartia"	5:06
9.	"Clear Blue Sky"	3:27
10.	"Choice Millionaire"	4:50
11.	"Nothing Stays the Same"	4:35
