= Late Goodbye =

Single by Poets of the Fall

from the album Signs of Life
- Released: 30 June 2004
- Genre: Alternative rock, post-grunge, acoustic rock, blues rock
- Length: 3:47
- Label: Insomniac
- Songwriters: Markus Kaarlonen, Marko Saaresto, Olli Tukiainen

Poets of the Fall singles chronology
| "Late Goodbye" (2004) | "'Lift'" (2004) |

"Late Goodbye" is a song by the Finnish rock band Poets of the Fall that appeared in the 2003 video game Max Payne 2: The Fall of Max Payne as well as on the band's debut album Signs of Life. It was also the first single released from the album and reached No. 14 on the Finnish Singles Chart as well as No. 1 on Radio SuomiPOP's Top 30 chart.

== Track listing ==
1. "Late Goodbye" (album version) – 03:47
2. "Late Goodbye" (radio edit) – 03:18
3. "Late Goodbye" (unplugged) – 03:33
4. "Late Goodbye" (piano instrumental) – 03:19
5. "Everything Fades" – 03:09

== Release history ==
| Country | Release date |
|---|---|
| Finland | 30 June 2004 |
| Worldwide iTunes | 12 April 2008 |

== Awards ==
| Year | Award | Title | Result |
|---|---|---|---|
| 2004 | Game Audio Network Guild (G.A.N.G) Awards | Best Original Vocal Song – Pop | Won |
| 2004 | YleX's"Best of 2004" | Best Finnish Song | 7th place |
| 2007 | Helsingin Sanomat | Most Beloved Finnish Rock Song | Nominated |

== Max Payne 2 ==
The song can be heard by the player at various times during the game:

- It is overheard playing through the headphones of the janitor cleaning the basement of Max's apartment. He also sings and hums along to the lyrics.
- It is played by a cleaner on a piano for 24 seconds in a room in the apartments where several Inner Circle members live.
- The game's antagonists often whistle or hum the song when not talking or fighting.
- Max tries to play different versions of the song on a piano in one of the missions.
- Mona Sax sings it in the shower at her flat at the closed-down Address Unknown amusement park.
- The full song is also heard over the credits upon completion of the game.
