= Clearview (album) =

Studio album by Poets of the Fall
- Released: 30 September 2016
- Genre: Alternative rock
- Length: 40:15
- Label: Insomniac
- Producer: Stefan Boman

Poets of the Fall chronology
Jealous Gods (2014)	Clearview (2016)	Ultraviolet (2018)

Singles from Clearview
- 1. "Drama for Life" Released: 5 August 2016; 2. "Children of the Sun" Released: 22 March 2017; 3. "Moonlight Kissed" Released: 22 September 2017

Clearview is the seventh studio album by Finnish rock band Poets of the Fall, released on 30 September 2016 through Insomniac.

== Track listing ==
All tracks are written by Poets of the Fall

No.	Title	Length
1.	"Drama for Life"	3:26
2.	"The Game"	4:45
3.	"The Child in Me"	3:51
4.	"Once Upon a Playground Rainy"	3:36
5.	"Children of the Sun"	4:53
6.	"Shadow Play"	4:05
7.	"Center Stage"	4:05
8.	"The Labyrinth"	3:46
9.	"Crystalline"	3:44
10.	"Moonlight Kissed"	4:05

iTunes Store bonus track

No.	Title	Length
11.	"Drama for Life" (Radio Edit)	3:20

== Reception ==
A review on Sputnikmusic said: "Clearview is a solid release from Poets of the Fall that is only let down by playing things a bit too safe on the instrumental side."

== Charts ==
Chart (2016)	Peak position
Finnish Albums (Suomen virallinen lista)	2
