= Priya Seth =

Indian cinematographer

- Born: 1975 (age 50–51); Amritsar, Punjab, India
- Education: Welham Girls' School; St. Xavier's College, Mumbai; New York University Tisch School of the Arts
- Occupation: Cinematographer
- Years active: 1996–present
- Organization(s): International Collective of Female Cinematographers; Western India Cinematographers'Association; Indian Women Cinematographers' Collective
- Known for: Airlift, Chef, Barah Aana
- Relatives: Devika Bulchandani
- Website: priyaseth.com

Priya Seth (born 1975) is an Indian cinematographer, best known for her work in Indian feature films, advertisements, and underwater filming and photography. She is among a handful of women cinematographers currently working in the Indian mainstream cinema.

== Early life ==
Seth was born in Mumbai, India and was educated at Cathedral and John Connon School and Welham Girls' School, a boarding school in Dehradun. After school, she pursued a degree in economics at St. Xavier's College, Mumbai, and then later went on a six-month film-making course at the New York University Tisch School of the Arts.

== Career ==
=== Early career ===
After graduating, Seth got her first job as a clapper and assistant cameraman on Deepa Mehta's 1998 film Earth, followed by Jane Campion's Holy Smoke!, which was partially filmed in India in 1999.

After that, she worked on diverse projects such as music videos and commercials for FMCG brands, before returning to the cinema industry. Seth is a trained scuba diver and is known for her expertise in her underwater filming and photography. She has been the underwater DOP for Bollywood films like Dhobi Ghat and Mardaani 2.

=== Feature films ===
Seth's first solo feature film project was the indie Barah Aana, directed by Raja Krishna Menon and starring Naseeruddin Shah. She reunited with Menon on his 2016 historical drama film Airlift, starring Akshay Kumar and Nimrat Kaur. The film was noted for its bold, raw, and tense camerawork depicting the real events on which the film was based. She then worked on the Saif Ali Khan starring Chef, an official remake of the 2014 Hollywood film. In 2018, Seth shot the Season 2 of Zee5 web series Karenjit Kaur – The Untold Story of Sunny Leone, a show based on the life of former porn star-turned-actor Sunny Leone.

In 2017, Seth became the founding member of the Indian Women Cinematographer's Collective (IWCC), along with cinematographers Fowzia Fathima and Savita Singh.

== Filmography ==
=== Feature films ===
Year	Title	Director
2009	Barah Aana	Raja Krishna Menon
2016	Airlift	Raja Krishna Menon
2017	Chef	Raja Krishna Menon
2023	Pippa	Raja Krishna Menon
2023	Matka	Karuna Kumar

=== Web series ===
Year	Title	Language	Notes
2018	Karenjit Kaur – The Untold Story of Sunny Leone	English	Season 2, released on ZEE5
