= Airlift (film) =

2016 Indian film by Raja Krishna Menon

- Theatrical release poster
- Directed by: Raja Krishna Menon
- Written by: Raja Krishna Menon; Suresh Nair; Rahul Nangia; Ritesh Shah
- Produced by: Nikkhil Advani; Monisha Adwani; Aruna Bhatia; Bhushan Kumar; Gaurav Nanda; Krishan Kumar; Vikram Malhotra
- Starring: Akshay Kumar; Nimrat Kaur
- Cinematography: Priya Seth
- Edited by: Hemanti Sarkar
- Music by: Songs: Amaal Mallik; Ankit Tiwari; Background score: Arijit Dutta
- Production companies: T-Series Films; Cape of Good Films; Emmay Entertainment; Abundantia Entertainment
- Distributed by: Prateek Entertainments; Viacom18 Motion Pictures (India); B4U Motion Pictures (International)
- Release date: 21 January 2016 (Dubai); 22 January 2016 (India)
- Running time: 125 minutes
- Country: India
- Language: Hindi
- Budget: ₹30 Crores
- Box office: ₹221.67 Crores

Airlift is a 2016 Indian Hindi-language political thriller film directed by Raja Krishna Menon starring Akshay Kumar and Nimrat Kaur, that follows Ranjit Katyal (played by Kumar), a Kuwait-based businessman as he carries out the evacuation of Indians based in Kuwait during the Invasion of Kuwait by Saddam Hussein's Iraq which led to the beginning of the Gulf War. The film was jointly produced by Abundantia Entertainment, Cape of Good Films, Emmay Entertainment and T-Series on a total budget of ₹320 million. The plot is adapted from the real life story of Kuwait-based Indian businessmen such as Mathunny Mathews from Kerala, Harbhajan Singh Vedi etc.

Director Menon wrote the script after studying the whole incident of the war and the predicament of Indians based in Kuwait. He then approached Akshay Kumar for the role of a character based on Mathunny Mathews, He agreed to act and produce under his banner of Hari Om Entertainment, Kumar reported that his 80% profit share will be included in the film's budget and he will not charge fees. Filming began in February 2015. The first schedule of the film was reportedly shot in Al-Hamra Palace Beach Resort in Ras Al Khaimah. The sets were re-created to depict Kuwait during 1990. The film was shot in several locations including, Ujjain, Bhuj and Rajasthan. Kumar collaborated with the flight company Air India to promote the film, which had a major contribution to the evacuation of a record-breaking number of Indians during the war.

Airlift opened theatrically worldwide on 22 January 2016, coinciding with Republic Day weekend. The film received positive reviews from the critics, praising the film's strong writing, soundtrack, scale, editing, cinematography and significant praise went to Akshay Kumar for his acting, calling it one of his best performances. The film was a commercial success, it emerged as a blockbuster at Indian as well as abroad box office. Airlift has grossed over ₹2.21 billion in global markets. The film is featured among the 2016 Indian Panorama section of the International Film Festival of India.

== Plot ==
In 1990, Indian expatriate Ranjit Katyal (Akshay Kumar) is a successful businessman based in Kuwait, and is very well-connected with officials in Kuwait City and Baghdad. He has a happy home with his wife Amrita (Nimrat Kaur) and their daughter Simran. He calls himself a Kuwaiti and is often derisive towards Indians.

After a night of partying, Ranjit is woken up to a phone call from his friend and receives word that negotiations between Iraq and Kuwait have collapsed, and Iraqi troops have begun their invasion of Kuwait. The next morning, he discovers that Kuwait City is now occupied by the Iraqi Army. Ranjit and Nair, his driver, go out and drive to the Indian embassy in an attempt to take their family and leave Kuwait. They are stopped by Iraqi soldiers at a checkpoint and Nair is shot dead amidst the confusion. A shocked Ranjit is then taken to the Emir's palace. There he meets Iraqi Republican Guard officer Major Khalaf bin Zayd (Inaamulhaq), who reveals that he was the one who pulled up to the checkpoint earlier and prevented Ranjit from being harmed. Major Khalaf, who knows Ranjit from Ranjit's visits to Iraq, chides him but extends his personal friendship, ensuring Ranjit and his family's safety from the soldiers.

From there, Ranjit goes to the Indian embassy where he learns that the Kuwaiti government has fled into exile. Some 170,000 Indians in Kuwait are now stranded as refugees. Iraqi forces continue to push through Kuwait and Ranjit's mansion is raided by Iraqi soldiers, but his wife and child manage to escape to his office. Ranjit convinces his friends to work together, and they set up a makeshift camp for some 500 Indians with Major Khalaf's permission. Amrita urges Ranjit to use his leverage to extricate his own family, but Ranjit, who ordinarily would have just looked out for himself, appears to have a change of heart. He decides to stay and help the other Indians leave Kuwait.

Ranjit learns that the Indian embassy in Kuwait has been evacuated and phones the Indian External Affairs Ministry in New Delhi, where he reaches the Joint Secretary, Sanjiv Kohli (Kumud Mishra), and asks for arrangements to be made for the evacuation. Later, the camp is looted by Iraqi soldiers and they harass some of the refugees. Ranjit pays a visit to Major Khalaf and talks to him about this, to which the Major simply extends his apologies, and also reveals that President Saddam has already permitted Indians to leave Kuwait, but the problem is that they have no way to do so. Ranjit travels to Baghdad to try to negotiate safe passage out of Kuwait, but to no avail. The only remaining option, Iraqi Foreign Minister Tariq Aziz, turns out to be helpful. He discloses that an Indian merchant ship is due to arrive in Iraq with various supplies, and permits the Indian refugees to leave on the ship. However, Ranjit later receives news of the UN embargo which bars ships from entering or leaving Iraq, effectively crushing their hopes of getting out.

Meanwhile, Kohli is somewhat of a sluggard, but when his father (Arun Bali) recounts their tale of woe during the partition of India, Kohli is inspired to actively help Ranjit. He approaches the national airline, Air India, to lead an evacuation of the 170,000 Indians in Kuwait and gets the Indian embassy in Amman, Jordan to issue permits. As the Indians leave Kuwait, Ranjit comes across yet another checkpoint where he encounters hostile Iraqi soldiers who, in absence of any passports or IDs, threaten to kill Amrita. A skirmish erupts between Ranjit and the soldiers, following which the people in Ranjit's convoy come forward and outnumber the Iraqi soldiers. Ranjit lets them live and the convoy passes. They arrive in Jordan where planes from Air India and Indian Airlines would fly the refugees to Mumbai. The Indians salute Ranjit as they board the planes that will take them home. Ranjit however begins to feel guilty over his attitude towards Indians as he sees the Indian Tricolour. The film ends with Ranjit indicating that he always believed India never did anything for its citizens, but after being rescued by the country he and a lot of Indians had disowned, he may not ever say that in the future.

== Cast ==
- Akshay Kumar as Ranjit Katyal, based on Mathunny Mathews and Harbhajan Singh Vedi
- Nimrat Kaur as Amrita Katyal
- Inaamulhaq as Major Khalaf bin Zayd
- Avtar Gill as Amrit Pal
- Feryna Wazheir as Tasneem
- Purab Kohli as Ibrahim Durrani
- Prakash Belawadi as George Kutty
- Pawan Chopra as Brij (Indian ambassador in Kuwait)
- Lenaa as George Kutty's wife, Deepti Jayarajan
- Kumud Mishra as Sanjeev Kohli, Joint Secretary of MEA
- Arun Bali as Bauji (Kohli's father)
- Ninad Kamat as Kurien
- Nissar Khan as Ashok
- Kaizaad Kotwal as Behram Poonawalla
- Gunjan Malhotra as Meher Poonawalla
- Surendra Pal as External Affairs Minister
- Sanjay Bhatia as Official at Indian Embassy in Amman
- Rajesh Jais as Official at Indian Embassy in Iraq
- Jennifer Mistry Bansiwal as Rita, Amrita's Domestic Help
- Parveen Kaur as Ashok's Wife & Amirta Katyal's Friend
- Pooja Nair as Preethi

== Production ==
=== Development ===
According to the director of the film, Raja Krishna Menon, he wrote the script after studying the whole incident of war and the predicament of Indians based in Kuwait. He then approached Akshay Kumar for the role of a character based on Mathunny Mathews, the real life businessman who spearheaded the evacuation efforts named 'Ranjit Katyal', to which he agreed to act and produce under his banner of Hari Om Entertainment. Kumar felt that the film possessed significant offbeat potential, with a good amount of "patriotism" and a reason to be a proud Indian. He stated that Balraj Sahni's role in the film Waqt (1965) is his inspiration for the role where an earthquake shatters the peaceful life of Sahni's character.

Due to the film's theme based on the rescue operation, the film was compared with Ben Affleck-starrer Argo (2012) sharing the similar storyline. However, Kumar stated that the film does not have any connection with it and is completely based on a true story. He also said that comparing the film with Argo is an "insult" and it is not a matter of humour for Indians to achieve this end. Kumar reported that his 80% profit share will be included in the film's budget and he would not charge fees for the same.

=== Filming ===
Principal photography was started in February 2015. The first schedule of the film was reportedly shot in Al-Hamra Palace Beach Resort in Ras Al Khaimah and Ujjain, Madhya Pradesh in early March 2015. The sets were re-created to depict Kuwait during 1990. The second schedule of the film was shot in Bhuj, Gujarat and Rajasthan, India. Kumar and Purab Kohli reportedly learnt Arabic language for their roles. Final portions of the film were completed with shooting of a music video for the song "Soch" in December 2015.

== Soundtrack ==
Airlift

Soundtrack album by Amaal Mallik and Ankit Tiwari
- Released: 24 December 2015
- Studio: T-Series Studios
- Genre: Feature film soundtrack
- Length: 22:06
- Language: Hindi
- Label: T-Series

The soundtrack for Airlift was composed by Amaal Mallik, with the exception of the song "Dil Cheez Tujhe Dedi" being guest composed by Ankit Tiwari, and the lyrics were written by Kumaar. The first song "Soch Na Sake" was released on T-Series official YouTube channel on 17 December 2015. The full soundtrack album which includes 5 songs was released on 24 December 2015. The music rights are acquired by T-Series.

The song "Dil Cheez Tujhe Dedi" is largely inspired by Algerian singer Khaled's hit song from the 1990s "Didi", while the song "Soch Na Sake" is a reimagination of the Punjabi song "Soch" by Harrdy Sandhu, Jaani and B Praak. Inspiration for the song is reported by News 18.

Track listing
No.	Title	Singer(s)	Length
1.	"Soch Na Sake"	Arijit Singh, Tulsi Kumar, Amaal Mallik	4:41
2.	"Dil Cheez Tujhe Dedi" (Music by Ankit Tiwari)	Ankit Tiwari, Arijit Singh	4:31
3.	"Mera Nachan Nu"	Brijesh Shandilya, Divya Kumar, Amaal Mallik	3:42
4.	"Tu Bhoola Jise"	K.K.	4:31
5.	"Soch Na Sake" (Solo Version)	Arijit Singh	4:41
Total length:			22:06

== Release ==
Airlift was released on a total number of 1,800 to 2,000 screens in India. Overseas, including Middle East, the film released with total number of 70 screens on 21 January. The film was declared tax free by Uttar Pradesh and Bihar state governments on 28 January and 17 February 2016.

=== Kuwaiti ban ===
While initially slated for release, Airlift was eventually banned from cinemas in Kuwait for undisclosed reasons.

=== Game ===
Airlift: The Rescue, a mobile video game developed by Hungama Gameshastra Pvt. Ltd. (a joint venture of Hungama and Gameshastra) was released as a tie-in for the film during its release.

== Reception ==
=== Box office ===
The film had its highest opening in Emirates with the amount of AED 900,000, breaking the records of widest released film. The film earned ₹124 million (US$1.3 million) during its first day run on 2,500 screens in India. Airlift collected ₹835 million (US$8.9 million) in total during the first week, reports film analyst Taran Adarsh.

=== Critical reception ===
On the review aggregator website Rotten Tomatoes, 85% of 13 critics' reviews are positive, with an average rating of 6.9/10.

Bollywood Hungama gave the film four and a half stars out of five, stating "On the whole, Airlift is a classic film based on a real-life incident that is told extremely well on screen. It is surely one of the best films to come out this year and will pick up with a strong word of mouth. Just do not miss this one!" Ananya Bhattacharya of India Today also rated the film four and half stars out of five, terming the film as "gritty, edge-of-the-seat and heart-stopping" and stated "Airlift is a tale of unmatched heroism. In all, Airlift is the story of unparalleled courage and unsung heroes. From unknown names in the Ministry of External Affairs in Delhi to people who had their Indianness rearing its head from within just when it was required, Airlift is un-miss-able. Go watch it." Srijana Mitra Das from The Times of India gave the film 4 stars out of 5 praising its direction and wrote "Airlift has one of Akshay Kumar's best performances – along with other sterling acts. Certain cameos are outstanding. Airlift's scale is impressive and editing (Hemanti Sarkar) deft." Writing for NDTV, Saibal Chatterjee also gave it four stars and stated, "Airlift is a rare megastar vehicle that derives obvious benefits from the lead actor's magnetism without subjugating itself to the need to make the most of his presence in the cast. Airlift is a film that every Indian, and every Bollywood buff despairing for genuinely high-quality storytelling, must watch." Shubha Shetty Saha writing for Mid-Day felt that the film is "Akshay Kumar's best till date," awarded the film four stars and commented, "Menon's deft execution of the plot in hand, crisp editing (Hemanti Sarkar), dialogues which are perfectly tailored for the script, and good cinematography (Priya Seth) make this film a must watch. Don't miss it."

Anupama Chopra from Hindustan Times rated the film three and a half stars out of five, and described it as "Akshay Kumar's finest hour" and wrote "Big props to Akshay for putting his heart and might behind such an unconventional project, and to director Raja Krishna Menon for showcasing a story that had been lost on the sidelines. But Airlift never takes full flight because of the screenplay. Airlift is tonally inconsistent but the film is fuelled by a palpable sincerity." Ritika Handoo of Zee News also gave it three and half stars out of five and termed Akshay as the "hero" of this film. She stated, "Akshay as Ranjit Katyal is the anchor of this ship called 'Indians' who need to sail smoothly ashore. The film shows how exactly the Indians in Kuwait were evacuated or rather 'airlifted' safely after Saddam Hussein led the Iraq war. Akshay is the hero because he played a man, who in real life, stretch his boundaries for saving humanity. Akshay's dedication and sincerity in portraying such roles with brilliance makes 'Airlift' have a safe landing even at the box office windows. A must watch for every Indian. Remember this will make you believe in what Indians can do when 'united'." Shubhra Gupta in her review for The Indian Express also gave the film three and a half stars and noted " 'Airlift' plays it right, and gives us drama, even if things slow down and turn a trifle repetitious post interval. But overall, 'Airlift' is a good film, solidly plotted, well executed and well-acted. Just lose the songs, and the occasional underlined background music the next time." Rajeev Masand from CNN-IBN gave the film three and half stars, saying "The occasional speed bumps aside, there are many moments that soar. Raja Menon turns an important story into a compelling film. Don't miss it." Arkadev Ghoshal of IBTimes India gave it three and half stars and stated, "Airlift" is probably a good release for the weekend preceding Republic Day, when patriotic sentiments are high. However, one only wishes that Menon had given a little more attention to some other aspects of the film. He does show promise, so here's expecting better cinema from him." Sukanya Verma of Rediff also gave it three and half stars and termed the film as "taut, tense, terrific" and summarised, "Oh what a beauty Akshay's performance is. Old-school gallantry, contemporary tone, his measured delivery is the soul of and savior in Airlift. Larger-than-life might is commonplace, but larger-than-life intensity is rare. Here, it is unmistakable, unceasing." Raja Sen of Rediff.com gave a 3 out of 5 star rating explaining that "Films about genuinely unsung heroes are a fine thing, and Raja Krishna Menon's Airlift is a sincere effort to celebrate an insanely daunting task."

Surabhi Redkar from Koimoi gave three stars praising Akshay's performance and noted, "Airlift is definitely a one-time watch since it is a story of an unsung hero and also India's proud moment. Akshay Kumar certainly gives an impressive performance." Sarita A Tanwar of DNA also gave the film three stars and stated, "A spirited effort and Akshay Kumar's performance are the highest points of 'Airlift'." Subhash K. Jha of SKJBollywoodNews also gave the film four and half stars and stated, "Airlift is first and foremost a heart-stopping thriller. It's the story of a man whose heroism is awakened in the hour of crisis."

=== Historical accuracy ===
The movie was criticized for oversimplifying the complex operation of the airlift. The portrayal of diplomats and bureaucrats in the film was criticized by present and former officials in the Indian Ministry of External Affairs. K.P. Fabian, who was the Joint Secretary of the Gulf division at the Ministry during the Gulf War in 1990, accused the film of deliberately spreading misinformation about the role of government officials at the time.

Ministry spokesperson Vikas Swarup tweeted that the film was great entertainment but short on facts while the Foreign Secretary Nirupama Rao tweeted that the film fell completely short in its research on the role of the Ministry in the '90–'91 Gulf War.

== Accolades ==
Award	Category	Recipient	Result	Ref(s)
Stardust Awards	Stardust Award for Actor of the Year – Male	Akshay Kumar	Nominated	
Stardust Awards	Stardust Award for Best Supporting Actor	Purab Kohli	Nominated	
Stardust Awards	Stardust Award For Best Screenplay	Raja Krishna Menon, Ritesh Nair, Rahul Nangia	Nominated	
Stardust Awards	Stardust Award For Best Story	Raja Krishna Menon	Nominated	
Stardust Awards	Stardust Award for Best Film of the Year	Airlift	Nominated	
Zee Cine Awards	Zee Cine Award for Best Actor – Male	Akshay Kumar	Nominated	
Zee Cine Awards	Zee Cine Critics Award for Best Actor – Male	Akshay Kumar	Nominated	
Zee Cine Awards	Zee Cine Award for Best Film	Airlift	Won	
Zee Cine Awards	Zee Cine Award for Best Story	Raja Krishna Menon	Nominated	
Zee Cine Awards	Zee Cine Critics Award for Best Film	Airlift	Nominated	
Zee Cine Awards	Zee Cine Award for Best Background Score	Airlift	Won	
9th Mirchi Music Awards	Listeners' Choice Song of the Year	"Soch Na Sake"	Won	

== See also ==
- India–Kuwait relations
- India–Iraq relations
- Iraq–Kuwait relations
- Take Off
