= Harbajan Singh Vedi =

Indian billionaire

Harbhajan Singh Vedi
- Born: Harbhajan Vedi; 1 September 1937; Lyllpur
- Died: 24 August 2013 (aged 75)
- Known for: Playing a key role in evacuating 170,000 Indians from Kuwait during Invasion of Kuwait

Harbhajan Singh Vedi (1 September 1937 – 24 August 2013) was an Indian billionaire based in Kuwait and was one of the main persons credited with the safe airlift evacuation of 170,000 Indians from Kuwait during the 1990 Invasion of Kuwait, which is hailed as the largest civilian evacuation in history.

Vedi, Mathunny Mathews and many other people of India from Kuwait evacuated Indians and Harbhajan Singh Vedi helped the people in their survivor-ship.

== Film ==
Airlift the 2016 film, directed by Raja Krishna Menon, is based on the evacuation of this real story. With the help of them the 1990 airlift of Indians from Kuwait was carried out from 13 August to 11 October 1990 during the Invasion of Kuwait. Leading daily Times of India reported that Kuwait-based Malayali entrepreneur Mathunny Mathews (also known as Toyota Sunny) duly supported by Harbhajan Singh Vedi, played a stellar role in coordinating the evacuation operation by meeting the Indian ambassador in Baghdad and overseeing the transport of thousands of Indians to Amman via Baghdad by bus after striking a deal with Iraqi transporters, Indian authorities and UN.

== World record ==
Air India holds the Guinness Book of World Records for the most people evacuated by a civil airliner as a result of this effort. The operation was carried out during the Persian Gulf War in 1990 to evacuate Indian expatriates from Kuwait and Iraq. It is believed to be the largest civilian evacuation in history. The Indians based in Kuwait also helped in the evacuation efforts.
