= Mathunny Mathews =

Indian businessman (1936–2017)

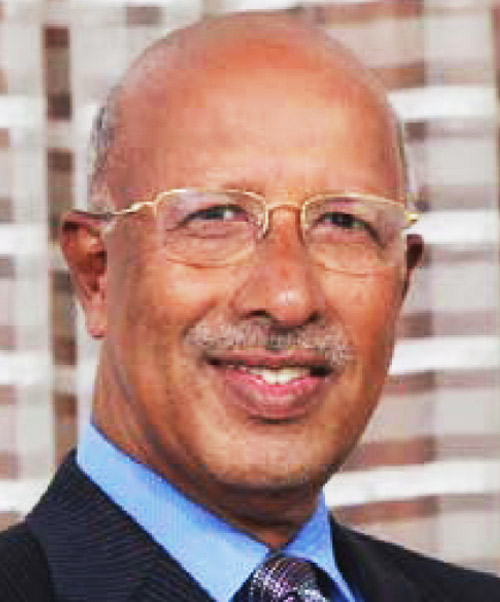
- Born: c. 1936; Eraviperoor, India
- Died: 20 May 2017 (aged 80–81); Kuwait City, Kuwait
- Known for: Playing a key role in evacuating 170,000 Indians from Kuwait during the 1990 Iraqi invasion

Mathunny Mathews (1936–2017), also known as Toyota Sunny, was an Indian businessman based in Kuwait. He was one of the people credited with the safe airlift evacuation of about 170,000 Indians from Kuwait during the 1990 Iraqi invasion, which is hailed as the largest civilian air evacuation in history.

== Early life ==
Matthews was born in 1936 in Eraviperoor, Kumbanad in the Indian state of Kerala and was popularly known as Toyota Sunny, owing to his work in Kuwait with the Toyota agency owned by the Al-Sayer Group. He retired in 1989 as its Managing Director (MD). During the early phase of industrialisation in Kuwait, Matthews had reached Kuwait by ship in 1956 as a prospective immigrant for employment. He was also the chairman of the Jabriya Indian School in Kuwait and one of the founding members of the Indian Art's Circle, a widely recognised cultural association of all Indian expatriates in Kuwait.

== 1990 airlift of Indians from Kuwait ==
With the help of Mathunny Mathews, the airlift of Indians was carried out from 13 August to 11 October 1990 after the Iraqi invasion of Kuwait. Air India holds the Guinness Book of World Records for the most people evacuated by a civil airline as a result of this effort. The operation was carried out during the Persian Gulf War in 1990 to evacuate Indian expatriates from Kuwait and Iraq. It is believed to be the largest civilian evacuation in history. The Indians based in Kuwait also helped in the evacuation efforts, The Times of India reported that Mathews and Harbhajan Singh Vedi, played a stellar role in co-ordinating the evacuation operation by meeting the Indian ambassador in Baghdad and overseeing the transport of thousands of Indians to Amman via Baghdad by bus after striking a deal with Iraqi transporters, Indian authorities and the UN.

== In popular culture ==
In the 2016 Indian film Airlift, Akshay Kumar portrayed the role of Ranjit Katyal, a fictional character based on both Mathunny Mathews and Harbajan Singh Vedi.
