= India–Iraq relations =

- Iraq: India

Diplomatic mission
- Embassy of Iraq, New Delhi: Embassy of India, Baghdad

The India–Iraq relations, also known as the Indo–Iraqi relations, are the bilateral relations between the Republic of India and the Republic of Iraq. Relations between the two nations have traditionally been friendly and collaborative. Cultural interaction and economic trade between the Indus Valley and Mesopotamia date back to 1800 BCE. The 1952 Treaty of Friendship established and strengthened ties between contemporary India and Iraq. By the 1970s, Iraq was regarded as one of India's closest allies in the Middle East.

Ties between India and Iraq were disrupted during the Iran–Iraq War, the 1990-1991 Gulf War and the 2003 Iraq War. However, the bilateral relations normalised after the establishment of democratic government in Iraq.

== History ==
=== Medieval period ===
Since the early 13th century, the Delhi Sultans typically acknowledged the symbolic authority of the Abbasid Caliphate as a source of Islamic legitimacy. Symbolic acts such as minting coins in the caliph's name and mentioning the caliph's name in the khutbah reflected their formal allegiance to the caliphate system. Most Delhi Sultans followed the Hanafi school of Sunni Islam. Some of these Sultans depending on the political conditions in their reigns, established diplomatic relations with the Abbasid Caliphate in Iraq and later in Cairo to receive symbolic recognition and strengthen their legitimacy among the Muslim population of the Indian subcontinent.

=== Early modern period ===
Emperor Aurangzeb often supported the Ottoman Empire's enemies; he extended cordial welcome to two rebel governors of the Ottoman-controlled Muntafiq Emirate of Basra, and granted them and their families a high status in the imperial service. Indian trade with Iraq through Basra was especially lucrative during the Mamluk regime's tenure in Iraq.

=== Ties between Shias in Iraq and Shias in India ===
Roots of North Indian Shi'ism in Iran and Iraq: Religion and State in Awadh, 1722–1859 by J.R.I. Cole.

Shi'i Indians funded the Hindiyya canal in the Iraqi city of Najaf. North India's Awadh (Oudh) state was Shi'i and it provided funding to the Iraqi Shi'i shrine cities of Karbala and Najaf, channeling the money towards Persian mujtahids in the cities. The Hindiyya canal was finished in 1803 and money was able to be channeled to the Shi'i shrines cities like Najaf from India and Iran because western colonization did not touch Shi'i areas until the end of the 19th century.

Mir Jafar was born in Dehli into a family of Arab origin whose ancestors had migrated from Najaf in Iraq.

The Iraqi Shia writer and poet Muzaffar Al-Nawab is of Indian descent.

Iraq was one of the few countries in the Middle East with which India established diplomatic relations at the embassy level immediately after its independence in 1947. Both nations signed the "Treaty of Perpetual Peace and Friendship" in 1952 and an agreement of co-operation on cultural affairs in 1954. India was amongst the first to recognise the Baath Party-led government, and Iraq remained neutral during the Indo-Pakistani War of 1965. However, Iraq sided alongside other Gulf States in supporting Pakistan against India during the Indo-Pakistani War of 1971, which saw the creation of Bangladesh. Nonetheless, Iraq and India continued to maintain strong economic and military ties. During the early 1980s, the Indian Air Force was training more than 120 Iraqi MiG-21 pilots. The security relationship was expanded in 1975, when the Indian Army sent training teams and the Indian Navy established a naval academy in Basra. India continued to provide considerable military assistance to Iraq through the Iran–Iraq War. In addition to training, India provided technical assistance to the Iraqi Air Force through a complicated tripartite arrangement involving France.

The eight-year-long Iran–Iraq War caused a steep decline in trade and commerce between the two nations. During the Gulf War, India was opposed to the use of force against Iraq. India stopped the refueling of military planes after the second week of war in 1991. Iraq had been one of India's largest export markets before the 1991 Gulf War. It opposed UN sanctions on Iraq, but the period of war and Iraq's isolation further diminished India's commercial and diplomatic ties. Iraq had supported India's right to conduct nuclear tests following its tests of five nuclear weapons on May 11 and May 13 in 1998. In 2000, the then-Vice President of Iraq Taha Yassin Ramadan visited India, and on July 6, 2002 President Saddam Hussein conveyed Iraq's "unwavering support" to India over the Kashmir dispute with Pakistan. India and Iraq established joint ministerial committees and trade delegations to promote extensive bilateral co-operation.

=== Economic ties and Oil-for-Food Programme ===
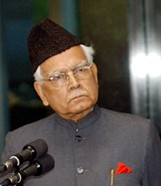
Former Minister for External Affairs K. Natwar Singh possibly received illegal kickbacks from Iraq over the Oil-for-Food Programme.

India's ties with Iraq suffered due to the UN sanctions on Iraq, but India soon developed trade within the Oil-for-Food programme, which permitted Iraq to export oil for essential goods. However, a 2005 investigation of the programme revealed that the then-Indian minister of external affairs Natwar Singh and the Congress Party had possibly received kickbacks from the Baathist regime, leading to his resignation at the request of Prime Minister Manmohan Singh.

== Post-2003 ==
India had claimed in the official Ministry Of External Affairs press release that the military action of the US-led 2003 invasion of Iraq lacks justification due to disharmony within the United Nations Security Council and cited reports which said military action was avoidable. India hinted that it would consider sending troops to post-war Iraq to help maintain security and peace after a unanimous vote in the UN Security Council over the Coalition's presence and mission in Iraq. However this was ruled out after protests from public and political parties which have been opposing USA. It normalised its ties with the new democratically elected government of Iraq in 2005, seeking to restart trade and co-operation. Indian businesses applied for contracts for reconstruction projects to the Iraqi government, and more recently the activities of Iraqi businesses in India have been growing rapidly.

Iraq is one of the major suppliers of crude oil to India, exporting 220,000 barrels of oil per day to Indian Oil Corporation. In 2013 June, Salman Khurshid, the foreign minister of India, visited Iraq regarding security and business issues, the first to do so since 1990.

=== Iraqi Kurdistan ===
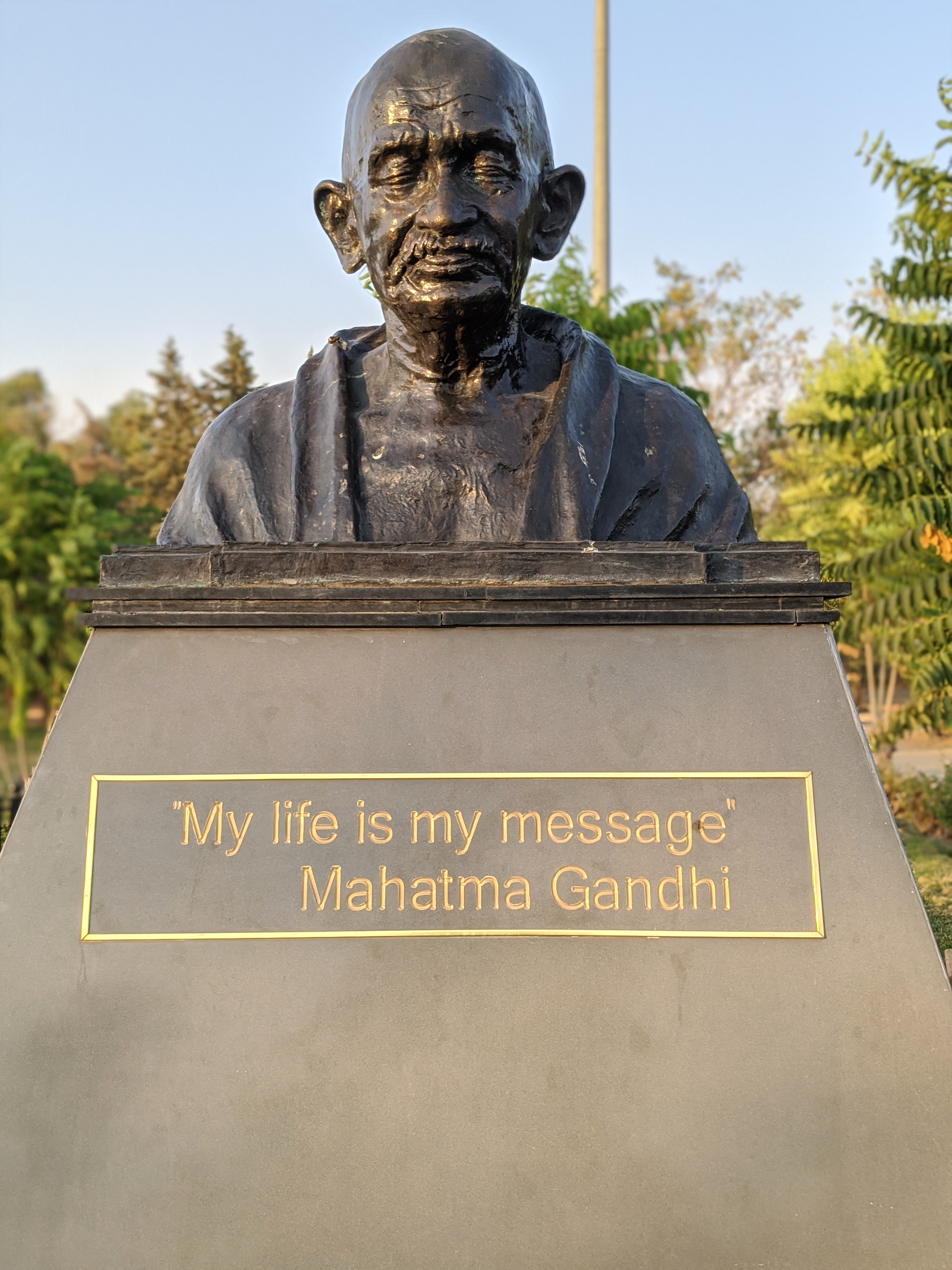
Gandhi statue in Erbil, Iraqi Kurdistan

There has been limited diplomatic relations between India and Iraqi Kurdistan. India purchases Kurdish crude oil sold through Turkish companies. Several Indian citizens work in Iraqi Kurdistan. Many Kurds travel to India for educational or medical purposes. In July 2014, Hemin Hawrani, head of the Kurdistan Democratic Party's international relations wing, told The Hindu that he hoped for deeper political and economic ties with India, describing the country as "an important partner". Hawrani also expressed his desire to see the Indian government open a consulate in Erbil, and invited Indian companies to invest in Kurdistan. In November 2014, the Indian government sent special envoy Ambassador Suresh K. Reddy to visit Kurdistan and meet Kurdish government officials. Reddy stated that India "fully supports the Kurdistan Region during this difficult time", and expressed confidence in the Kurdish government and the Peshmerga forces to preserve the stability and security of the region. The Ambassador also praised the role of Peshmerga forces in fighting ISIL, and announced that the Indian government would open a consulate in Kurdistan.

== See also ==
- Saddam Beach, a village in Kerala, India named after former Iraqi President Saddam Hussain
- Foreign hostages in Iraq#India
