= Devika Bulchandani =

Indian-American marketing executive

Devika Seth Bulchandani
- Born: 1970 (age 55–56); Amritsar, Punjab, India
- Education: University of Southern California (1991), St. Xavier's College (Autonomous), Welham Girls' School
- Known for: Global chief executive officer of Ogilvy & Mather
- Spouse: Ashwin Bulchandani (married 1994–present)
- Children: 2
- Relatives: Priya Seth

Devika Bulchandani is the Global CEO of Ogilvy. She is the first Indian-origin person to head the New York-based British advertising agency. She was previously the Global President at the company, and was appointed CEO in September 2022.

== Early life and education ==
Bulchandani was born in Amritsar, India, and attended Welham Girls' School, the all-girls boarding school in Dehradun. She then pursued English and Psychology at St. Xavier’s College, Mumbai, followed by a Master’s in Communications at the University of Southern California in 1991.

== Career ==
Bulchandani was the Chief Strategy Officer, and later President, at McCann. She left McCann to join Ogilvy in 2020. In January 2022, she was named Global President at Ogilvy. In September 2022, she was appointed the Global CEO of the company.

== Personal life ==
Devika Bulchandani is married to Ashwin Bulchandani, they have two children. Her younger sister is the Indian cinematographer, Priya Seth.
