= Supari (film) =

2003 Indian action film

- Film poster
- Directed by: Padam Kumar
- Written by: Padam Kumar; Mushtaq Sheikh; Anuraadha Tewari
- Produced by: Padam Kumar
- Starring: Uday Chopra; Rahul Dev; Nandita Das; Purab Kohli; Nauheed Cyrusi; Irrfan Khan
- Cinematography: Ramji; R. Velraj
- Edited by: Sanjay Verma
- Music by: Vishal–Shekhar
- Distributed by: Yash Raj Films
- Release date: 20 June 2003
- Running time: 143 minutes
- Country: India
- Language: Hindi
- Budget: ₹4.25 crore
- Box office: ₹2.65 crore

Supari (transl. Contract killing), titled Supari - Your Time Starts Now in the UK, is a 2003 Indian Hindi-language action film directed and produced by Padam Kumar. The film stars Uday Chopra, Rahul Dev, Nandita Das, Purab Kohli, Nauheed Cyrusi, and Irrfan Khan. The story is set in the Mumbai underworld, and follows four friends who become contract killers after losing a bet to an underworld figure.

Released theatrically on 20 June 2003, it was also the first Hindi-language film to be later distributed online via Kazaa. Although the film was not commercially successful, the performances were praised.

== Plot ==
Aryan Pandit lives a middle-class lifestyle with his family in Nasik, India, where the entire family depends on his salesman father's earnings. He relocates to Mumbai's St. Andrews College with big dreams of being wealthy and driving a red Ferrari. He befriends three other middle-class youths: Papad, Mushy, and Chicken. He borrows money from Matka Rajan, gambles it, loses everything, and is unable to repay. As a result, Rajan sets his goons on him.

Aryan goes to a man named Baba for help, who in turn takes him to Mamta Sekhari. Sekhari offers to hire him as a hitman, agreeing to pay him 20,000 rupees for every killing so that he can repay his gambling loan. Aryan reluctantly accepts, is trained by Baba to shoot a gun, and kills his first target, none other than Rajan himself. He tells his friends about his good fortune, and they join forces with him. In all killing contracts, they are provided with a photograph and the location and are instructed to look at the photo just 15 minutes before killing the person. In this manner, the friends enjoy their newfound wealth. When Aryan's Parsi girlfriend, Dilnawaaz, finds out, she wants him to quit. He does, but his friends refuse to let go of this easy money and luxurious life. Shortly after that, the trio are given a contract; before the killing, they look at the photograph of Aryan. The trio knows that it is too late to back out of this 'supari' (contract killing). Soon events take a worse turn as one by one they get killed. Chicken commits suicide, and a gun battle ensues where Papad and Mushy are killed by Sekhari's men. Aryan puts everything to an end by killing Mamta Sekhari and Baba once and for all.

== Cast ==
- Uday Chopra as Aryan Pandit
- Rahul Dev as Papad
- Purab Kohli as Chicken
- Akashdeep Saigal as Mushy
- Nandita Das as Mamta Shekari
- Irrfan Khan as Baba
- Nauheed Cyrusi as Dilnaswaaz 'Dillu'
- Supriya Karnik as Papad's sister
- Sanjay Batra as Shekhar Ranjan

== Production ==
Director Padam Kumar originally signed Arjun Rampal for the lead role in the film but replaced him with Uday Chopra after Rampal became a huge star and had a certain image following the release of the latter's debut film Pyaar Ishq Aur Mohabbat (2001).

== Soundtrack ==
Supari

Soundtrack album by Vishal–Shekhar
- Released: 6 March 2003
- Genre: Feature film soundtrack
- Length: 27:04
- Label: Saregama

The music was composed by Vishal–Shekhar, with lyrics written by Vishal Dadlani and Javed Akhtar.

Track listing
No.	Title	Singer(s)	Length
1.	"Tere Ishq Mein"	Vishal Dadlani, Mahalaxmi Iyer	4:07
2.	"Chand Chahiye"	Vishal Dadlani, Sunidhi Chauhan	5:26
3.	"Chhaha"	Sunidhi Chauhan, Shekhar Ravjiani	4:58
4.	"Bombai Bagiyan"	Makarand Deshpande, Hariharan	4:41
5.	"Bombay Town"	KK	5:08
6.	"Ek Saans"	Sukhwinder Singh	3:24

== Reception ==
Taran Adarsh from Bollywood Hungama gave the film a 1/5 rating, feeling the screenplay and characterizations were "faulty" and found the action sequences ordinary. However, he praised the dialogues, songs and performances. Jitesh Pillai from The Times of India also gave it a 1/5 rating and criticized the performances, dialogue and overabundance of characters, while praising Dev's performance and the cinematography. Saibal Chatterjee from Hindustan Times similarly gave it 1 star and felt Chopra was "terribly miscast" for the action hero role.

== Box office ==
Supari opened with ₹ 0.45 crore on the first day of release. It grossed ₹ 1.25 crore in its first weekend, and ₹ 1.85 crore in its first week. The film's closing collections amounted to ₹ 2.65 crore. It was one of the biggest commercial failures of 2003.
