= Amar Singh Chamkila (soundtrack) =

- Soundtrack album cover

EP by A. R. Rahman
- Released: 29 March 2024
- Recorded: June 2022 – July 2023
- Studios: Panchathan Records Inn, Chennai; Panchathan Studios, Mumbai
- Genre: Feature film soundtrack
- Length: 29:23
- Languages: Hindi; Punjabi
- Label: Saregama
- Producer: A. R. Rahman

A. R. Rahman chronology
Pippa (2023)	Amar Singh Chamkila (2024)	Maidaan (2024)

Amar Singh Chamkila is a soundtrack, composed by A. R. Rahman with lyrics written by Irshad Kamil. The 2024 Hindi film of the same name was written and directed by Imtiaz Ali that casts Diljit Dosanjh and Parineeti Chopra in the lead roles. The EP serves as the soundtrack album to the film that was released worldwide through Saregama on 29 March 2024. There are six original songs composed by Rahman that take the audience through life and times of the characters played by Dosanjh and Chopra.

While composing the soundtrack album Rahman blended the Punjabi music with the western musicals, adapting the compositions in a Broadway-styled theme to break the fourth wall in the musical sequences. To retain themes occurring in the original music by Chamkila, the songs were composed with mischievous and vulgar lyrics. However, none of the compositions by Chamkila were sampled or rerecorded by Rahman for the EP. Rahman sampled the traditional instruments - tumbi and algozha played by musicians from Punjab, India. While track "Vida Karo" and "Tu Kya Jaane" were recorded through the wee hours, the former is a farewell track, inspired by Shiv Kumar Batalvi poetry. "Naram Kaalja" stands as a traditional Punjabi composition. "Baaja" and "Ishq Mitaye" follow the Broadway themed structure. Rahman called termed the overall soundtrack album as 'naughty' and 'esoteric'.

The fourteen rerecorded version of the songs by Amar Singh Chamkila were released as a live album by Saregama on 29 May 2024. An ensemble of music composers - Chiranjit Ahuja, S. N. Gulati, K. J. Joy and K.S. Narula; rerecorded live vocals by Dosanjh, Chopra, Khushpreet Kaur and Nisha Bano sung through the film shooting. While the original background score was composed by Rahman, these compositions were used to cater the narrative requirements in the film.

Upon release, the soundtrack album received positive review from music critics who acknowledged the careful crafting on tunes, the mood, tone, beats and lyrical phrases. They went on to summarize that the soundtrack album captured the flavor of music from Punjab and well-woven as a musical-like saga.

== Development ==
=== Background ===
In October 2022, reports confirmed Imtiaz Ali and A. R. Rahman working on a new project that was tentatively titled as "Chamkeela". Ali wanted to Rahman compose the soundtrack album, where the latter opined that original songs by Amar Singh Chamkila were already present in the field of music. Rahman came up with the narrative technique of Broadway Theatre where people sing to the audience. He wanted to merge the Punjabi music with the western musical. He wanted the 'gossips', blaming Chamkila for the 'good or the bad' to be recorded into music. Lyricist Irshad Kamil and Rahman designed the songs rooted with rhythm changes and adapted them to the type of Broadway musical. As per him, the soundtrack album is in Punjabi and the parlance of the songs was common than soundtrack of Rockstar. The tracks conveyed philosophy by Chamkila but the genre was pop. Rahman called the music of the film "a very naughty picture". After a musical reconnaissance, Kamil pointed out existent "naughty" Punjabi lyrics sung by females in musical compositions by Chamkila. Also, he sang "naughty" and "mischievous" lyrics for wedding songs. Rahman called out his composition Rukmani Rukmani to bear similarity with such themes.

As per Ali, the Broadway structure gave 'mythical, larger-than-life quality' to the film. All the songs performed by Chamkila (Diljit Dosanjh), Amarjot (Parineeti Chopra) and the band were rendered live. In an interview with Livemint, Ali stated that when the characters singing in the film, they recorded them live. It was neither categorized nor qualified for playback singing, kept unsynced. Diljit and Parineeti did not record for the soundtrack album composed by Rahman. There were six songs, that take the audience through life and times of the protagonist's character. Ali opined that Rahman wanted to design a Punjabi-themed album but not all lyrics written in Punjabi language. In an interview with Radio Mirchi, Ali stated that it was Rahman who requested Amar Singh Chamkila should not be a sad film, quoting: "Chamkila's music was never sad; he was always celebrating". Also, further creative guidance came from Rahman, where Ali couldn't translate Chamkila's original songs, but had to make sure that the Hindi-speaking audience understand it through superimposed text on screen. Further, In the "Baaja" song, people are talking directly into the camera and giving different perspectives about who Chamkila was.

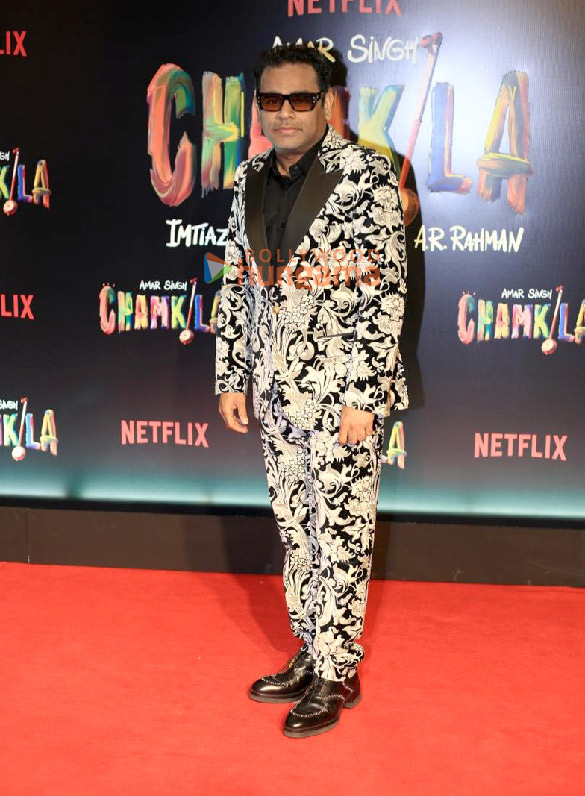
The film's original score and soundtrack album composer A. R. Rahman at the screening of Amar Singh Chamkila.

=== Recording ===
The team invited musicians from Punjab, India to Rahman's studio in Mumbai. There were four male singers and eight to nine female singers. Rahman sampled traditional instruments - alghoza and tumbi. As per Rahman, Chamkila's music was in Punjabi and likely to be understood by only a small number of people with a specialized knowledge or interest. The background score was composed by Rahman, despite an existent trove of Chamkila's original music that was untouched.

Rahman recorded the track "Vida Karo" on his piano during the wee hours. Kamil wrote the lyrics within forty-five minutes as Rahman wanted to record it on the go. To get into the creative process, Rahman requested to switch off the lights and asked for some candles to be lit. He was inspired by the Rahman music in Guru Dutt films for this song. Kamil was inspired by a poem of Shiv Kumar Batalvi. The track served as farewell to the characters of Chamkila and Amarjot who were killed for their music after facing years of prejudice and judgement. Rahman wanted Arijit Singh to lend his vocals, as he felt only Singh could justify the melody with the 'intense' attachment required for the track.

As per Ali, the track "Naram Kaalja" was derived from an old traditional Punjabi song that goes, 'mera naram kaalja tarke' which translates to ‘my soft heart spices up’. For "Ishq Mitaye", Ali wanted an "impressive" voice from northern India that communicates the story of Chamkila as well as that of Punjab. Unlike other tracks, it was Ali who took a while to approve vocals by Mohit Chauhan for the songs "Ishq Mitaye" and "Baaja". In an interview with The Indian Express, Rahman stated, for the song "Baaja": "We took a Broadway kind of structure where the lyrics tell the story and changed the tempo while remaining in the realm of Punjabi music. It led to something fresh." On recording the track "Tu Kya Jaane", the singer Yashika Sikka stated that she barely got time to rehearse as the melody was designed by Rahman in fifteen minutes. Kamil stated that the song was a replacement for another track, which wasn’t eventually included in the soundtrack. He wrote the song in seven minutes during the wee hours with Rahman. Ali termed the track as the one with vintage theme. Comedian Kapil Sharma was approached to record for track for the film but did not materialize due to the schedules, although he was one of the choices for the titular character.

== Reception ==
Critic Shilajit Mitra in his review for The Hindu stated: " There is a constant softening of mood and tone with A.R. Rahman’s pulsing original soundtrack." Lachmi Deb Roy who writes for Firstpost stated: "The best part of the film is that AR Rahman and Imtiaz Ali kept the original songs of Chamkila and didn’t modify it" Tatsam Mukherjee, in his review for The Wire, praised the track "Naram Kaalja" exclaiming: "which feels like a Rahman/Kamil homage to what a Chamkila song would sound like if sung solely by Amarjot". Poulomi Das of The Federal quoted: "biting wordmanship of Irshad Kamil, the electric soundscapes of AR Rahman" in her review. Jose Solis of Common Sense Media stated that the film features vibrant music by A.R. Rahman that pays homage to the singer. Critic Ekta Sinha in her review for Elle Magazine wrote: "The film’s jukebox has six songs that are carefully crafted to leave everyone mesmerised by their tunes. Amar Singh Chamkila’s music is backed by a team that has nothing left to prove, once again leave you in a tearjerker space." Critic Tushar Shukla from Medium concluded in positive after reviewing each track of the soundtrack album: "You can’t really listen to a song from this legendary team and have an instant reaction to it. They will never give anything short of miraculous. You might get hooked to a beat or a phrase, but there will always be a world that will be still left to absorb." Music critic Suanshu Khurana of The Indian Express called the soundtrack: "An out-and-out an Irshad Kamil triumph, a brilliant expression of imagery".

Aman Sharma reviewed the soundtrack for News18, " Rahman has provided the Punjabi master-touch that makes the lead song live up to the hype. The soundtrack not only captures the rise and times of the slain Punjabi singer in the 1980s, but also the flavour of Punjab through its lyrics penned by Irshad Kamil" In his review for The New Indian Express, Kartik Bhardwaj wrote: "A.R. Rahman’s music, coupled with Irshad Kamil’s lyrics, however, liven up the narrative. When love nestles between Amarjot and Chamkila, "Tu Kya Jaane" soothes in the background. "Ishq Mitaye" revs up the film when it starts lagging, "Naram Kaalja", although picturised with a celebratory zest, is a random squeeze into the screenplay and works better as a standalone music video." Critic Nandini Ramnath writes for Scroll, stating: "AR Rahman’s Punjabi pop-inflected Hindi soundtrack is woven into the musical-like saga." Steve Erikson of The Arts Fuse was unconvinced with the music, stated that incorporating A.R. Rahman's original songs take us out of Chakmila's perspective.

== Accolades ==
List of nominations and awards received by the soundtrack, listed in an order irrespective of the date of award ceremony.

Award	Date	Category	Recipient	Result	Reference
Filmfare OTT Awards	1 December 2024	Best Music Album, Film	A. R. Rahman	Won	
Filmfare OTT Awards	1 December 2024	Best Background Music (Web Original Film)	A. R. Rahman	Won	
Filmfare OTT Awards	1 December 2024	Best Sound Design (Web Original Film)	Dhiman Karmakar	Won	

== Track listing ==
The soundtrack album was released on 29 March 2024, through the record label Saregama. Unlike the release pattern of music albums of Hindi films on Netflix, the soundtrack was released prior to the film release.

Amar Singh Chamkila (Original Motion Picture Soundtrack) - EP
No.	Title	Singer(s)	Length
1.	"Ishq Mitaye"	Mohit Chauhan	4:33
2.	"Naram Kaalja"	Alka Yagnik, Richa Sharma, Pooja Tiwari, Yashika Sikka	5:07
3.	"Tu Kya Jaane"	Yashika Sikka	4:18
4.	"Baaja"	Mohit Chauhan, Romy, Suryansh, Inderpreet Singh	5:23
5.	"Bol Mohabbat"	A. R. Rahman, Kailash Kher	4:17
6.	"Vida Karo"	Arijit Singh, Jonita Gandhi	4:30
Total length:			29:23

On 29 May 2024, the live album of recordings used in the background score of the film was released through the record label Saregama. The 14 tracks, majority of them Dosanjh and Chopra have live recorded in their own voice for their stage performances in the film.

Amar Singh Chamkila (Original Motion Picture Soundtrack) - Live
No.	Title	Lyrics	Music	Singer(s)	Length
1.	"Ni Mai Diggi Tilak Ke"	Amar Singh Chamkila	Ram Saran Das	Diljit Dosanjh	01:02
2.	"Pat Doon Chugti Ni"	Amar Singh Chamkila	Charanjit Ahuja, S.N. Gulati	Diljit Dosanjh, Nisha Bano	01:58
3.	"Baapu Saada Ghum Ho Gaya"	Amar Singh Chamkila	Charanjit Ahuja, S.N. Gulati	Diljit Dosanjh, Nisha Bano	01:37
4.	"Kurti Sat Rang Di"	Amar Singh Chamkila	Charanjit Ahuja	Diljit Dosanjh, Khushpreet Kaur	00:49
5.	"Mitra Mai Khand Ban Gayi"	Amar Singh Chamkila	Charanjit Ahuja	Diljit Dosanjh, Parineeti Chopra	00:53
6.	"Bahan Which Bhabhi"	Amar Singh Chamkila	Charanjit Ahuja	Diljit Dosanjh, Parineeti Chopra	00:32
7.	"Lak Mera Kach Wargha"	Amar Singh Chamkila	Charanjit Ahuja, S.N. Gulati	Diljit Dosanjh, Parineeti Chopra	00:38
8.	"Kurti Satrang Di - Wedding Version"	Amar Singh Chamkila	Charanjit Ahuja	Diljit Dosanjh, Khushpreet Kaur	01:40
9.	"Mera Jee Karde"	Amar Singh Chamkila	K. S. Narula	Diljit Dosanjh, Parineeti Chopra	03:03
10.	"Baba Nankana"	Swaran Sivia	Charanjit Ahuja	Diljit Dosanjh	01:05
11.	"Shikhar Dopeheri"	Amar Singh Chamkila	K.J. Joy	Diljit Dosanjh, Parineeti Chopra	00:57
12.	"Kan Kar Gal Sun Makhna"	Amar Singh Chamkila	Charanjit Ahuja	Diljit Dosanjh, Parineeti Chopra	00:47
13.	"Bhul Gayi Mai Khund Kadna"	Amar Singh Chamkila	Charanjit Ahuja, K.J. Joy	Diljit Dosanjh	00:35
14.	"Do Ko Ti Purja"	Amar Singh Chamkila	K.J. Joy	Diljit Dosanjh, Parineeti Chopra	00:42
Total length:					16:38

== Personnel ==
Music credits adapted from the liner notes of soundtrack album.

Performance credits

- A. R. Rahman - Music composer, background score composer, album producer, music arrangement
- Hiral Viradia - Music supervisor
- Nitish R Kumar - Original studio mastering, mixing, recording engineer
- Yashika Sikka - Lead vocals (Track 2, 3), backing vocals (all tracks)
- Inderpreet Singh - Lead vocals (Track 4), backing vocals (all tracks)

=== Technical and production ===
- Riyasdeen Riyan - Head of Technical Services, Dolby Atmos mastering
- Suresh Permal - Senior engineer
- Karthik Sekaran - Senior engineer
- Dilshaad Shabbir Shaikh - Recording engineers, backing vocals
- Hriday Gattani - Recording engineer, backing vocals
- Sreekanth Hariharan - Recording engineer
- Sarath Santosh - Recording engineer
- Suryansh - Assisting engineer, backing vocals
- Aravind Crescendo - Assisting engineer
- Sathish V Saravanan - Assisting engineer
- Harshil Pathak - Assisting engineer
- Naval Chikhliya - Assisting engineer
- R Samidurai - Musician Coordinator
- Abdul Hayum - Musician Coordinator
- Parag Chhabra - Additional rhythm arrangement

=== Instruments ===
- Hanif Dhafrani - Dhol, Live rhythm
- Aslam Dhafrani - Dhol
- Omkar Salunkhe - Live rhythm
- Keyur Barve - Live rhythm
- Gautam Sharma - Live rhythm
- Arun Solanki - Live rhythm
- Deepak Bhatt - Live rhythm
- Pratap Rath - Live rhythm
- Ashish Venkateswaran - Flute
- Paras Nath - Flute
- Nikhil Ram - Flute
- Vijay Yamla - Percussions, Tumbi
- SM Subhani - Mandolin, Banjo
- Keith Peters - Bass
- Hamta Baghi - Frame Drums

=== Backing Vocals ===
Harshil Pathak, Romy, Aasa Singh, Arvinder Singh, Tajinder Singh, Devender Pal Singh, Sarthak Kalyani, Gurtaj, Divya Iyer, Aanandi Joshi, Pinky Madsani, Shifa Ruby, Meenu Kale
