= Pippa (film) =

2023 Indian film by Raja Krishna Menon

- Official release poster
- Directed by: Raja Krishna Menon
- Written by: Ravinder Randhawa; Tanmay Mohan; Raja Krishna Menon
- Produced by: Ronnie Screwvala; Siddharth Roy Kapur
- Starring: Ishaan Khatter; Mrunal Thakur; Priyanshu Painyuli
- Cinematography: Priya Seth
- Edited by: Hemanti Sarkar
- Music by: A. R. Rahman
- Production companies: RSVP Movies; Roy Kapur Films
- Distributed by: Amazon Prime Video
- Release date: 10 November 2023
- Running time: 139 minutes
- Country: India
- Language: Hindi

Pippa is a 2023 Indian Hindi-language biographical war film based on the life of Captain Balram Singh Mehta of India's 45 Cavalry regiment who, along with his siblings, fought on the eastern front during the Indo-Pakistani War of 1971. Named after the Soviet amphibious war tank PT-76, which floats on water like an empty tin, the film traces Mehta's coming-of-age as he steps up to prove himself in Bangladesh Liberation War. It is an adaptation of real life events during the Battle of Garibpur in 1971, and is written and directed by Raja Krishna Menon.

The film was produced by RSVP Movies and Roy Kapur Films, with Ronnie Screwvala and Siddharth Roy Kapur as producers. It stars Ishaan Khatter, Mrunal Thakur and Priyanshu Painyuli in lead roles. The film is an adaptation of Brigadier Balram Singh Mehta's war memoir, 'The Burning Chaffees'.

The film premiered on 10 November 2023 on Amazon Prime Video.

== Plot ==
Background: On 25 March 1971, Pakistan Army soldiers entered Dhaka University and indiscriminately fired at students and staff, with the tragedy becoming known as the 1971 Dhaka University massacre. Pakistan's President Yahya Khan launched Operation Searchlight to crush the Bengali nationalist movement. Thousands were killed, and thousands of Bengali women were captured as sex slaves by the Pakistani Army. Millions fled across the border into India to take refuge.

Captain Balram Singh Mehta is a young officer in the 45th Cavalry regiment, which is equipped with the PT-76 tank, nicknamed 'Pippa'. He has disciplinary issues and tends to often get into trouble with his senior officers. His elder brother is Major Ram Mehta, who is trying to instill discipline in his brother. Radha Mehta is their sister, and the three of them live with their mother Maati in Delhi.

One day, Major Ram is called to a forward area in preparation for the upcoming war. Captain Balram is denied from going to the front and assigned a desk job because of his indiscipline, while the rest of his regiment proceeds to the front. Meanwhile, Radha proves herself to be good at cryptography and is recruited into the 'Communication and Analysis Wing', a signals intelligence organisation that decodes enemy messages.

Major Ram is ordered to covertly enter East Pakistan (Bangladesh) under the false name Mohammad Nadeef from Rawalpindi to train the Mukti Bahini, and advise them in conducting operations. Captain Balram is ordered to work on the PT-76 tank to come up with some improvements for seating four people instead of three, which he does successfully. While on an inspection tour, the Army Chief General Sam Manekshaw is impressed by his innovations and orders him to join his regiment on the front.

Major Ram leads the Mukti Bahini in a number of successful operations against the Pakistan Army. However, during one of the operations he gets captured. He is taken to a camp where he is tortured for information. However, he is able to endure the torture and does not reveal his identity or any other information.

Captain Balram's regiment along with the 14th Punjab battalion crosses the border and engages Pakistani units in the Battle of Garibpur. In the battle, Captain Balram's senior officer and squadron commander, Major Daljit "Chiefy" Singh Narang, is killed in action, requiring Captain Balram to assume command. Captain Balram successfully leads his unit to victory.

Soon after, he receives a call from Radha that as per intelligence sources, Major Ram is missing in action. By coincidence, a captured Pakistani Air Force Ex-Seargent who has rebelled against the Pakistan Army tells him that there is one Indian Army officer being held captive at a particular post and that he wants to fight for India.

Radha also decodes a Pakistani communication that indicates that the United States Seventh Fleet is moving towards East Pakistan in order to intervene in support of Pakistan. That brings an extra urgency to India's operations to secure victory and Pakistan's surrender before the US ships can get within striking distance.

Captain Balram's troop makes contact with the Mukti Bahini, who offers to lead him to the camp where Major Ram is being held. Major Ram is about to be shot for not revealing any information, but the Mukti Bahini rebels reach at the right time and shoot his would-be executioner. Captain Balram's tank unit also arrives, and after a fierce battle, the Pakistani camp is captured and many Bengali women PoW are freed. Major Ram and Captain Balram are also reunited.

Shortly after, the Pakistan Army surrendered, and Bangladesh became independent. Major Ram, Captain Balram and Radha return home to their mother.

== Cast ==
- Ishaan Khatter as Captain Balram Singh Mehta
- Mrunal Thakur as Radha Mehta
- Priyanshu Painyuli as Major Ram Mehta
- Soni Razdan as Maati
- Inaamulhaq as Shibli
- Bishal Rungta as LD Harish
- Suryansh Patel as Ramphal
- Anuj Singh Duhan as Lt. Tejinder Singh Sidhu "Speedy"
- Kamal Sadanah as Field Marshal Sam Manekshaw
- Chandrachoor Rai as Maj. Daljit Singh Narag "Chiefy"
- Soham Majumdar as Anirban Mukherjee
- Leysan Karimova as Russian translator Zena
- Neeraj Purohit as Major Pratap Singh

== Production ==
Principal photography commenced in September 2021. Production wrapped in October 2021.

== Soundtrack ==
Pippa

Soundtrack album by A. R. Rahman
- Released: 6th November 2023
- Recorded: 2021
- Studio: Panchathan Record Inn and AM Studios
- Genre: Feature film soundtrack
- Length: 24:29
- Label: Zee Music Company

A. R. Rahman chronology
Pathu Thala (2023)	Pippa (2023)	Amar Singh Chamkila (2024)

Singles from Pippa
- 1. "Rampage" Released: 6th November 2023

The music of the film is composed by A. R. Rahman. The first single titled "Rampage" was released on 6 November 2023.

Track listing
No.	Title	Lyrics	Singer(s)	Length
1.	"Rampage"	MC Heam	MC Heam, Krystal Garib	2:46
2.	"Main Parwaana"	Shellee	Arijit Singh, Pooja Tiwari, Nisa Shetty, Rakshita Suresh	5:23
3.	"Jazbaat"	Shellee	Jubin Nautiyal, Shilpa Rao	4:17
4.	"Karar Oi Louho Kapat"	Kazi Nazrul Islam	Rahul Dutta, Tirtha Bhattacharjee, Pijush Das, Shrayee Paul, Shalini Mukherjee, Dilasa Chowdhury	3:28
5.	"Mohabbatein Shukriya"	Shellee	Vishal Mishra, Suzanne D'Mello	3:35
6.	"Balram's Anagnorisis"	Instrumental	A. R. Rahman	2:13
7.	"The Mines"	Instrumental	Sarthak Kalyani	2:49
Total length:				24:29

== Reception ==
On the review aggregator website Rotten Tomatoes, 50% of 10 critics' reviews are positive, with an average rating of 5.3/10.
