= Nauheed Cyrusi =

Indian model and actress

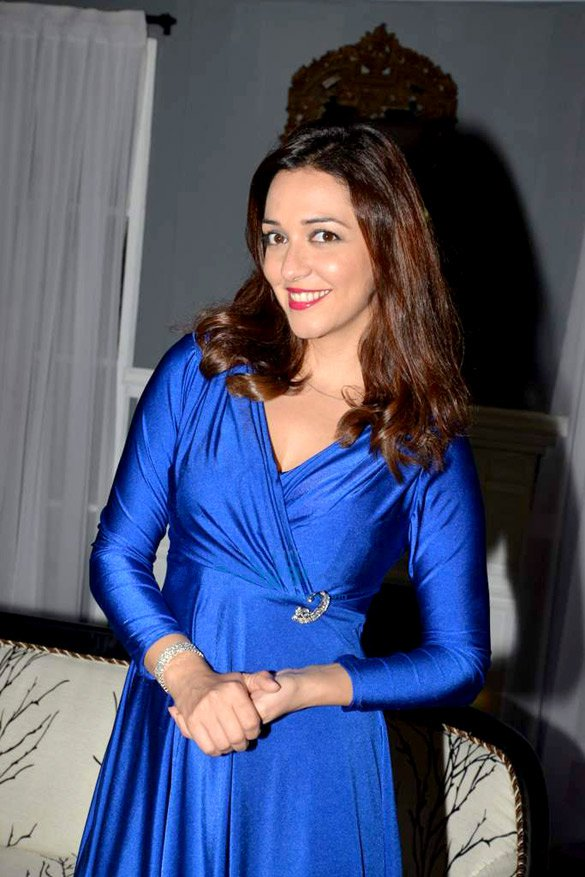
- Cyrusi at the Blackberrys Spring/Summer 2013 collection unveiling
- Born: 19 October 1982 (age 44)
- Occupations: Actress; model; VJ
- Years active: 1999–2015; 2021, 2026
- Spouse: Rustom Contractor (m. 2017)

Nauheed Cyrusi is an Indian actress, model, and VJ.

== Early life ==
Cyrusi was born into a Parsi Zoroastrian family. She was born and raised in Mumbai and did her schooling from The J.B. Vachha Girls High School and graduated from the Jai Hind College with a degree in Business Management.

== Career ==
Nauheed first appeared in an advertisement for Dhara Refined Oil, while she was in school. Subsequently, she went on to appear in advertisements for Head & Shoulders, Britannia Little Hearts Biscuits, and Ayurvedic Concepts (now Himalaya).

She also appeared in several music videos, most notably for the song "Piya Basanti".

She made her debut in 2003 with Padam Kumar's Hindi film, Supari, starring Uday Chopra. Subsequently, Vikram Bhatt chose her for Inteha opposite Ashmit Patel. She then appeared in youth-oriented tele-series Hip Hip Hurray. In 2004, Cyrusi starred in the Telugu film Sakhiya with Tarun Kumar.

She attended the India Fashion Week and the Allen Solly Fashion Show, along with fellow actress Koel Purie. In 2007, she appeared in Life Mein Kabhie Kabhiee, ADA...A Way of Life, and Anwar, which was directed by Manish Jha, and also Lakeer.

She featured in Kisaan and Kurbaan in 2009 and Kuch Spice To Make It Meetha in 2012 with Purab Kohli and Kavish Mishra.

== Personal life ==
She married Rustom Contractor on 5 January 2017.

== Albums ==
| Year | Album | Song | Co-stars | Singers |
|---|---|---|---|---|
| 1999 | Chahat | Teri Chahat Mein | Aarti Chabria | Harry Anand |
| 2000 | Piya Basanti | Piya Basanti Re | Donovan Wodehouse | Sultan Khan, K. S. Chithra |
| 2000 | Kehna To Hai | | Shahid Kapoor | Kumar Sanu |
| 2002 | Muskaan | "Wo Ban Sawar Ke" | | Pankaj Udhas |

== Filmography ==
=== Films ===
| Year | Film | Role | Language |
|---|---|---|---|
| 2003 | Supari | Dilnawaaz 'Dillu' | Hindi |
| 2003 | Inteha | Tina Saxena | Hindi |
| 2004 | Lakeer | Bindiya | Hindi |
| 2004 | Sakhiya | Chandana | Telugu |
| 2006 | Holiday | Samara | Hindi |
| 2006 | Rockin' Meera | Meera | English |
| 2007 | Anwar | Mehreen "Mehru" | Hindi |
| 2007 | Life Mein Kabhie Kabhiee | Monica Seth | Hindi |
| 2007 | Aggar | Ritu Chaudhary | Hindi |
| 2008 | Sirf | Shalu | Hindi |
| 2008 | Bhootnath | Tina | Hindi |
| 2008 | Rafoo Chakkar: Fun on the Run | Juli Vipun Patel | Hindi |
| 2009 | 42 km | Divya | Hindi |
| 2009 | Aasma: The Sky Is the Limit | Diya | Hindi |
| 2009 | Love Ka Tadka | | Hindi |
| 2009 | Meeting Se Meeting Tak | | Hindi |
| 2009 | Betchalor Party | Tanu | Hindi |
| 2009 | Kisaan | Titli Kaur | Hindi |
| 2009 | Main Aurr Mrs Khanna | Nina | Hindi |
| 2009 | Kurbaan | Salma | Hindi |
| 2010 | Ada... A Way of Life | Gul | Hindi |
| 2012 | Shirin Farhad Ki Toh Nikal Padi | Anahita | Hindi |
| 2012 | Kuch Spice To Make It Meetha | Tarana | Hindi |
| 2014 | Jai Ho | Simran Choudhry | Hindi |
| 2015 | Jaan Ki Baazi | | Hindi |
| 2026 | Jab Khuli Kitaab | Farnaaz | Hindi |

=== Television ===
| Year | Title | Role |
|---|---|---|
| 1999–2001 | Hip Hip Hurray | Meera |
| 2000 | Just Mohabbat | Guest appearance |
| 2009 | Fear Factor: Khatron Ke Khiladi (season 2) | Herself |
| 2013 | Welcome - Baazi Mehmaan-Nawaazi Ki | Herself |
| 2021 | Bombay Begums | Piya Punwani |

=== Web series ===
| Year | Title | Role |
|---|---|---|
| 2021 | Dev DD 2 | Aditi Kapadia |
| 2021 | Six | Orvana Joseph |
