= Lakeer – Forbidden Lines =

Lakeer- Forbidden Lines
- Theatrical release poster
- Directed by: Ahmed Khan
- Screenplay by: Ahmed Khan; Shadab Khan
- Dialogues by: Mehboob
- Story by: Ahmed Khan
- Produced by: Vivek Kumar
- Starring: Sunny Deol; Suniel Shetty; John Abraham; Sohail Khan; Nauheed Cyrusi; Apoorva Agnihotri; Raj Zutshi; Razak Khan
- Cinematography: Johny Lal
- Edited by: Mohammed Ashfaque
- Music by: Songs: A. R. Rahman; Score: Aadesh Shrivastava
- Production company: Vicky Films Pvt. Ltd.
- Release date: 14 May 2004
- Running time: 168 minutes
- Country: India
- Language: Hindi

Lakeer – Forbidden Lines is a 2004 Indian Hindi-language romantic action thriller film directed by Ahmed Khan in his directoral debut. The film stars Sunny Deol, Suniel Shetty, John Abraham, Sohail Khan and Nauheed Cyrusi. The music was composed by A. R. Rahman and the background score by Aadesh Shrivastava. The film was released on 14 May 2004.

== Plot ==
Karan Rana and Bindiya are childhood friends and live with Karan's brother Arjun Rana, a powerful, wealthy gangster. Arjun was actually adopted from the poor slums as a young boy by Suraj Rana. Karan is Suraj’s real son, and Bindiya is the daughter of one of Suraj’s former colleagues. After both fathers died, Bindiya was adopted into Arjun’s household, and he looked out for both her and Karan while they grew up. Now, Karan's feelings for Bindiya are more than friendship; however, she is unaware of his feelings and gradually falls in love with Saahil Mishra. Saahil comes from a low-class society in the same slums that Arjun once grew up in and attends the same college as Karan and Bindiya.

One day, Karan sees a love letter by Saahil to Bindiya and tears it up. His friend Rony humiliates Saahil for falling in love with Bindiya and being so poor. Saahil gets angry and tries to kill himself. However, when Saahil's brother Sanjay "Sanju" Mishra, a car mechanic, finds him unconscious and badly wounded, he cannot control his anger and goes looking for Rony. However, when Sanju gets to the college, he sees Karan sitting down, wearing Rony's jacket with his name on the back, and starts beating him up in public. Karan is hospitalized when Sanju finds out that he has beaten Karan and not Rony. Arjun wants to seek revenge against Sanju for beating up his brother badly. However, Arjun is unaware of Bindiya's feelings for Saahil and Karan's for Bindiya. Saahil advises Sanju to give up his violent ways. Sanju hands himself over to Arjun and gets badly beaten up by his men. Saahil apologizes to Sanju and decides to leave Bindiya.

One month later, Saahil starts working in a cafe. Bindiya tries to meet Saahil every day, but he escapes every time; however, they soon fall in love again. Sanju also approves of her. Meanwhile, Karan returns from the hospital and decides to meet Arjun and tell him about his love. Arjun is happy to know that Karan is in love with Bindiya. That night, Rony challenges Saahil to a fight, where Saahil beats up Rony brutally.

Meanwhile, Karan proposes to Bindiya at a derelict church where she believes a party for his recovery is held. However, this is just a ruse: he arranged it for only him and Bindiya, along with a bunch of presents and cards inside. She tells him that she considers Karan a best friend but loves Saahil. Karan becomes furious. After beating Rony, Saahil takes his gun to kill Karan. Sanju enters Arjun's bungalow to tell him the truth about Karan. He beats up all his goons. Arjun cannot control his anger and starts beating up Sanju. Rony then comes to Sanju's aid and tells Arjun the truth about Karan. Karan's love turns into a deadly obsession, and he forces Bindiya to marry him on the spot. Saahil arrives, and eventually, a dangerous fight breaks out between him and Karan. Karan hits Saahil repeatedly with an iron rod in the face and knocks him unconscious. Arjun comes there to rescue Bindiya and talk to Karan. Karan shoots Sanju's arm, while Saahil regains consciousness. Karan is about to shoot Bindiya and Saahil, but Bindiya tells Karan that she hates him for his actions. Arjun tearfully shoots Kannan, who dies on the spot. Arjun takes Karan's body to the church and is heartbroken and guilt-ridden that he did not want to kill his brother, despite being wrong. Saahil, Bindiya, and Sanju apologise to and pacify Arjun, saying he was not wrong, but Karan was.

== Cast ==
- Sunny Deol as Arjun
- Suniel Shetty as Sanjay "Sanju" Mishra, Saahil's elder brother
- Sohail Khan as Karan, Arjun's younger brother
- John Abraham as Saahil Mishra, Sanju's younger brother
- Nauheed Cyrusi as Bindiya
- Apoorva Agnihotri as Ronny D'Souza
- Vrajesh Hirjee as Brij Khanna, Saahil's friend
- Hemant Birje as Anees Ghanchi, Arjun's bodyguard
- Raj Zutshi as Montu, Sanju's friend.
- Avtar Gill as Gani Chacha
- Razak Khan as Javed Hashmi aka Pilot
- Vishwajeet Pradhan as Police Inspector Kadam
- Suresh Chatwal
- Dhananjay Mandrekar as Shetty, Arjun's bodyguard.
- Rana Jung Bahadur as Sachin

== Music and soundtrack ==
Lakeer - Forbidden Lines

Soundtrack album by A. R. Rahman
- Released: 6 January 2004 (Digital Release); 14 May 2004 (Film)
- Recorded: 2000 ("Paighaaam" song only); 2003 (Rest of all the songs)
- Studio: Panchathan Record Inn
- Genre: Film soundtrack
- Label: T-Series
- Producer: A. R. Rahman

A. R. Rahman chronology
Udhaya (2003)	Lakeer - Forbidden Lines (2004)	Meenaxi: A Tale of Three Cities (2004)

The music for the songs of the film was composed by A. R. Rahman and the lyrics were penned by Mehboob. The background score of the movie was done by Aadesh Shrivastava.

Rahman reused three songs from his earlier film, Rhythm, with only four new songs composed, due to a lack of time. The songs of Rhythm were inspired from the 5 elements of the world. Originally, the song "Paighaam" was supposed to appear in the Tamil film Rhythm but was cut due to cancellation of the Hindi dubbed version's release.

Song	Artist(s)	Notes
"Nachley"	Daler Mehndi, Kunal Ganjawala	Reused "Taniye Tananthaniye" from Rhythm
"Paighaam"	Kavita Krishnamurthy, Shaan,	Reused "Kaatre En Vasal" from Rhythm
"Sadiyaan"	Udit Narayan, Hariharan, Madhushree, Kailash Kher, Karthik	
"Offho Jalta Hai"	Asha Bhosle, Sonu Nigam	Reused "Ayyo Pathikichu" from Rhythm
"Rozana"	Viva	
"Shehzaade"	Kunal Ganjawala	

== Reception ==
NowRunning gave the film 2 out of 5 stars, "Regrettably the scriptwriter goes back to every mafia movie you've seen from Scarface to Vaastav to Gang without bothering to put a fresh spin into the genre". Planet Bollywood gave the film 7 out of 10 stars, praising the cast performances but criticised Sunny Deol's role overshadowing everyone else’s roles in the second half.
