= Barah Aana =

- Directed by: Raja Krishna Menon
- Written by: Story and Dialogues: Raja Krishna Menon; Screenplay: Raj Kumar Gupta
- Produced by: Raj Yerasi; Giulia Achilli; Raja Krishna Menon
- Starring: Naseeruddin Shah; Vijay Raaz; Arjun Mathur; Tannishtha Chatterjee
- Cinematography: Priya Seth
- Release date: 13 March 2009
- Running time: 97 minutes
- Country: India
- Language: Hindi
- Budget: 4.5 crore
- Box office: 0.82 crore

Barah Aana is a 2009 Indian black comedy drama film written and directed by Raja Menon. The title refers to Barah (12 in Hindi) and in Hindustani aanas (or annas), meaning 3/4 Rupee (or 75 paise), which was a unit of Indian currency before decimalisation. Barah Aana stars Naseeruddin Shah, Vijay Raaz, Arjun Mathur, and Tannishtha Chatterjee. The film depicts the lives of working-class Indians in a globalized milieu and how events spiral out of control when the characters try their hands at crime.

== Plot ==
Set in today's Mumbai, Barah Aana revolves around three friends: Shukla, a driver, Yadav, a watchman, and Aman, a waiter. Shukla is an older man, stoic and steady. Yadav, in his 30s, is meek and something of a pushover at work but exhibits an underlying mischievous nature. Aman is young, dynamic, and ambitious. In typical Mumbai fashion, the three are roommates, and the clash of their personalities regularly results in humorous, tongue-in-cheek banter.

Things take a turn when the watchman becomes prey to misfortune; his son gets typhoid, and he has to arrange 5000 rupees for the medical tests. He goes door to door asking for money in the society he works for, but no one helps him. Upset, he sits near a roadside stall where a few miscreants trouble him. In anger and frustration, he hits one of them. However, he brings the injured man home. After consultation with Shukla and Aman, Yadav decides to leave the man on the road, as he has not seen anyone's face. He goes out for six hours, and in the same evening the three of them leave the man somewhere on a secluded road, and Yadav calls the man's relative to pick the man from there. It is later revealed that Yadav has actually taken a ransom of 30,000 rupees from that man's father-in-law to release him safely. This changes his perspective, boosting his self-confidence enough to make him think that he has a new, low-risk way to make money. The next day Yadav reveals the truth to Aman. As Aman loves a foreigner named Kate, he needs money to get settled with her. He joins Yadav's further plans to execute kidnapping in a similar fashion. Both of them persuade Shukla to join them, and Shukla shows initial reluctance but later joins them both. The three now embark on the journey of regularly kidnapping people to get smaller amounts as ransom.

As they get more and more mired in the events that follow, the three characters go through changes while they are pushed more and more against the wall.

== Cast ==
Actor	Role
Naseeruddin Shah	Shukla
Vijay Raaz	Yadav
Arjun Mathur	Aman
Tannishtha Chatterjee	Rani
Violante Placido	Kate
Benjamin Gilani	Mr. Mehta
Jayati Bhatia	Mrs Mehta
Barry John	Yuri
Mahabanoo Mody-Kotwal	Cutlet Aunty
Pankaj Tripathi	Municipal babu
Kuldeep Sareen	Gang leader

== See also ==
- Bollywood films of 2009
