= Chef (2017 film) =

2017 Indian film by Raja Krishna Menon

- Release Poster of the movie
- Directed by: Raja Krishna Menon
- Written by: Ritesh Shah; Suresh Nair; Raja Krishna Menon
- Story by: Jon Favreau; Raja Krishna Menon
- Based on: Chef by Jon Favreau
- Produced by: Bhushan Kumar; Krishan Kumar; Vikram Malhotra; Janani Ravichandran; Raja Krishna Menon
- Starring: Saif Ali Khan
- Cinematography: Priya Seth
- Edited by: Shivkumar V. Panicker
- Music by: Raghu Dixit
- Production companies: T-Series; Abundantia Entertainment; Bandra West Pictures
- Distributed by: AA Films
- Release date: 6 October 2017
- Running time: 133 minutes
- Country: India
- Language: Hindi
- Budget: ₹14.7 crore
- Box office: ₹10.6 crore

Chef is a 2017 Indian Hindi-language comedy-drama film co-produced and directed by Raja Krishna Menon. It is an official remake of the 2014 American film with the same name. The film stars Saif Ali Khan in the title role.

The film's principal photography began in October 2016 in Kochi. Chef was released on 6 October 2017. The film under-performed at the box office.

== Plot ==
Roshan Kalra (Saif Ali Khan) is a chef whose passion for his career supersedes everything else in his life, including his family. He lives away from his wife Radha Menon (Padmapriya) and son Aari (Svar Kamble). He decides to visit his son in Kochi and they have a good time together. When it is time to return to work, he reflects he has lost out on a lot of time with Aari. He decides to stay with his son and open a food truck, which serves both his purposes in life: cooking food and being with his son.

== Cast ==
- Saif Ali Khan as Roshan Kalra
- Padmapriya Janakiraman as Radha Menon
- Svar Kamble as Armaan Kalra (Ary)
- Chandan Roy Sanyal as Nuzrool
- Dinesh Prabhakar as Alex Oomen
- Milind Soman as Biju
- Sobhita Dhulipala as Vinnie
- Ramgopal Bajaj as Mr. Kalra, Roshan's Father
- Pawan Chopra as Sunil Manohari
- Shayan Munshi as Prateek
- Raghu Dixit as himself
- Neha Saxena as Neha (cameo)
- Abhishek Kumar as Dhaba Waiter
- Lokesh Mittal as Son of Dhaba Owner
- Ramachandran P. P. as Anillettan
- M. Gopalakrishnan as Union Leader
- Nishad Raj Rana as Chaudhary (Delhi Cop)
- Rajat Ajay Bose

== Soundtrack ==
Chef

Soundtrack album by Raghu Dixit
- Released: 31 August 2017
- Genre: Feature film soundtrack
- Length: 30:04
- Language: Hindi
- Label: T-Series

Raghu Dixit chronology
Happy New Year (2017)	Chef (2017)	Koode (2018)

The film's original songs and musical score were composed by Raghu Dixit. The song "Tere Mere" and its reprise were composed by guest composer Amaal Mallik. The lyrics were written by Ankur Tewari and Rashmi Virag. The first song of the film, "Shugal Laga Le", was composed and sung by Raghu Dixit and was released on 6 September 2017. The second song, "Tere Mere", sung by Armaan Malik, was released on 11 September 2017. The third song, "Banjara", which is sung by Vishal Dadlani, was released on 18 September 2017. The soundtrack was released on 31 August 2017 by T-Series.

Track listing
No.	Title	Lyrics	Music	Singer(s)	Length
1.	"Shugal Laga Le"	Ankur Tewari	Raghu Dixit	Raghu Dixit	4:42
2.	"Tere Mere"	Rashmi Virag	Amaal Mallik	Armaan Malik	5:43
3.	"Banjara"	Ankur Tewari	Raghu Dixit	Vishal Dadlani	4:13
4.	"Tan Tan"	Ankur Tewari	Raghu Dixit	Nikhita Gandhi	3:07
5.	"Khoya Khoya"	Ankur Tewari	Raghu Dixit	Shahid Mallya	3:07
6.	"Darmiyaan"	Ankur Tewari	Raghu Dixit	Raghu Dixit	5:13
7.	"Tere Mere" (Reprise)	Rashmi Virag	Amaal Mallik	Armaan Malik	3:59
Total length:					30:04

== Critical reception ==
Raja Sen of NDTV gave the film a rating of 2 out of 5, saying that, "Saif Ali Khan and the actors try hard, but lazy writing and direction make Chef a flavourless and bland meal". Meena Iyer of The Times of India praised the performance of the lead actor Saif Ali Khan and gave the film a rating of 3.5 out of 5, saying that, "Chef is predictable in parts, the journey is an enjoyable one." Sweta Kaushal of the Hindustan Times rated the film 1.5 out of 5 and said that, "Saif Ali Khan's Chef offers moments of brilliance which, if weaved in a more organised manner, may have given us a light, affable film. But a lazy and rather uninterested narrative takes away the pleasure."

Sukanya Verma of Rediff.com gave a rating of 2.5 out of 5 and said that, "In a premise begging for food porn, there's a shocking scarcity of sensory pleasure or vision. Chef is too dull to be delicious." Shubhra Gupta of The Indian Express rated it 2 out of 5 and said that, "Saif Ali Khan's film has some interesting flavours. But Chef feels derivative, and is a late coming of age tale of Peter-Pan-like adults. And that's got to do with the uneven writing. It is a good-looking film, with good-looking people only." Rajeev Masand awarded the film 2.5 out of 5, saying that, "Chef isn't perfect; it lags in places, offers quick-fix solutions to characters’ problems, and feels wholly familiar. But at a little over two hours, it doesn't ask much of you, and offers some pleasure in Saif Ali Khan's return to form as an actor hard to look away from."
