= Sakhiya =

- Directed by: Jayanth C. Paranjee
- Written by: Jayanth C. Paranjee; Paruchuri Brothers
- Produced by: R. Appalaraju; A.K. Kumar
- Starring: Tarun Kumar; Nauheed Cyrusi; Lakshmi
- Cinematography: Jahawar Reddy
- Edited by: Marthand K. Venkatesh
- Music by: Mani Sharma
- Distributed by: Suryodaya Arts
- Release date: 2 December 2004
- Country: India
- Language: Telugu

Sakhiya (transl. Companion) is a 2004 Telugu-language drama film written and directed by Jayanth C. Paranjee. This film starred Tarun, Nauheed Cyrusi, and Lakshmi in pivotal roles. The soundtrack of the film was composed by Mani Sharma.

== Plot ==
Hari (Tarun) is a happy-go-lucky youngster. His family is in big financial trouble as they need around Rs. 10 lakhs. Hari happens to save a factionist Durga Devi (Lakshmi) from her rival gang. Durga Devi gives him some money as a token of gratitude. She offers to give the entire amount he needs if he successfully brings back her daughter Chandana (Nauheed) from Switzerland.

Chandana prefers to stay in Switzerland, rather than her faction-ridden homeland. Hari travels to Switzerland, falls in love with Chandana and also makes sure that Chandana also falls in love with him. They travel back to India. Once he hands over Chandana to Durga Devi, Hari realizes that Durga Devi cheated him. Durga Devi wants to take revenge on her faction rival and also Chandana's father (Raj Kumar) by getting her son married to Chandana. The rest of the story is about how Hari saves Chandana from the clutches of Durga Devi and teaches Durga a lesson.

== Cast ==
- Tarun as Hari
- Nauheed Cyrusi as Chandana
- Lakshmi as Durga Devi
- Ali
- Ranganath as Hari's father
- MS Narayana as SI
- Duvvasi Mohan
- Banerjee as Durga Devi's brother
- Chittajalu Lakshmipati as Durga Devi's henchman
- Amit Tiwari as Raja, Durga Devi's son
- Paruchuri Venkateswara Rao as Chandana's uncle
- Srinivasa Reddy as Hari's friend
- Chitram Srinu as Hari's friend
- Raja Ravindra as Hari's elder brother
- Varsha as Hari's sister-in-law
- Sirisha
- Siva Parvathy

== Soundtrack ==
The music was composed by Mani Sharma.

Sakhiya

Soundtrack album by Mani Sharma
- Released: 3 October 2004
- Recorded: 2004
- Genre: Feature film soundtrack
- Length: 31:09
- Language: Telugu
- Label: Aditya Music
- Producer: Mani Sharma

Mani Sharma chronology
Gudumba Shankar (2004)	Sakhiya (2004)	Vidyardhi (2004)

Track list
No.	Title	Lyrics	Singer(s)	Length
1.	"Nannochi Takindhi"	Sahithi	Karthik, Gopika Poornima	04:35
2.	"O Chandrama"	Sahithi	Mallikarjun, K. S. Chithra	05:53
3.	"Vana Vatsayana"	Chinni Charan	S. P. Charan, Sunitha	05:03
4.	"Ranu Kada"	Veturi	S. P. Balasubrahmanyam, Kalpana	05:44
5.	"Notilona"	Chandrabose	Mallikarjun	05:18
6.	"Chekkaranti"	Sahithi	Mano, Lenina Chowdhary	04:36
Total length:				31:09

== Reception ==
A critic from Idlebrain wrote that "Over all, it is a disappointing film". A critic from Full Hyderabad wrote that "On the whole, nothing to write home about unless you're looking for sympathy".
