= Merlin D'Souza =

Indian composer and pianist

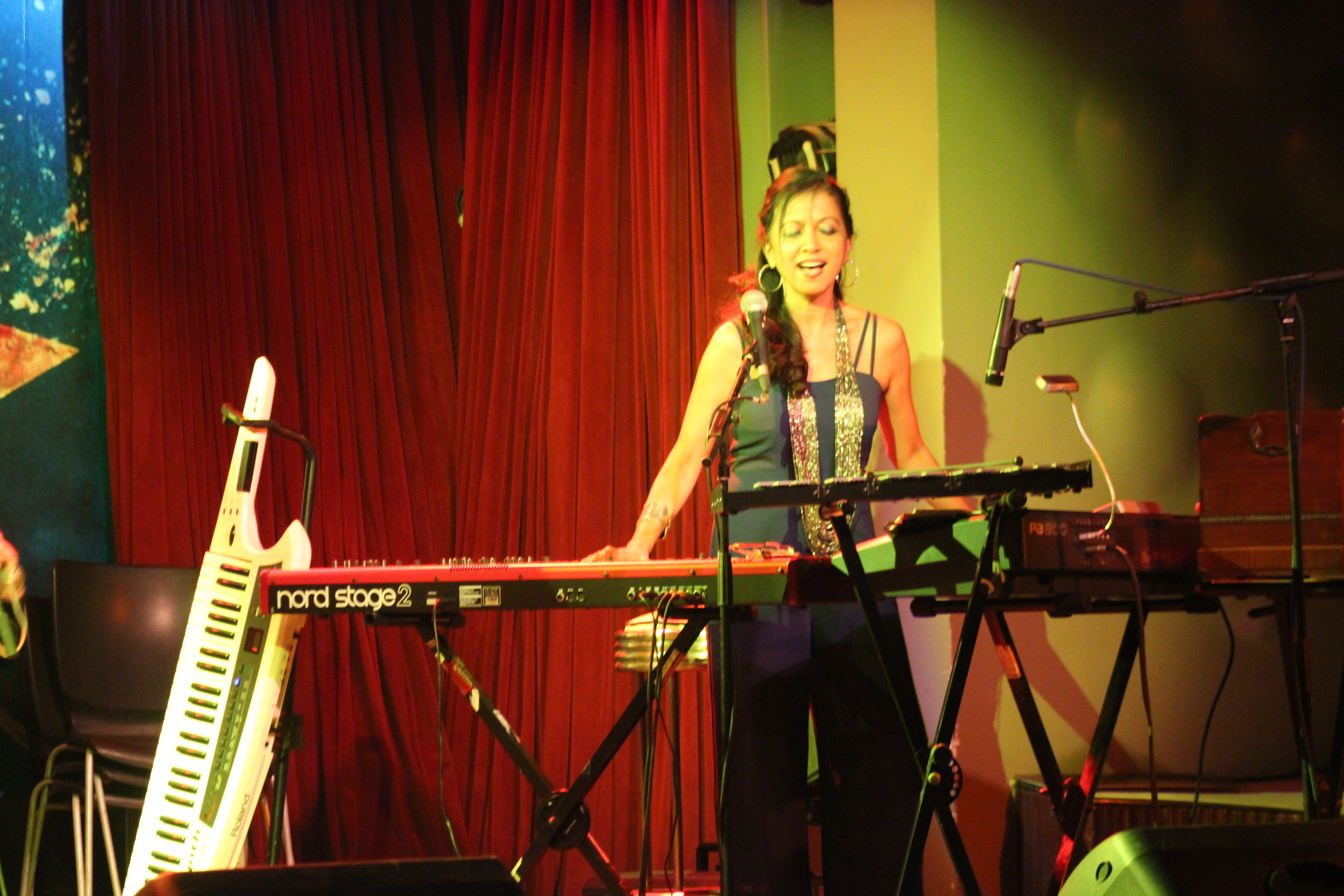
- Merlin DSouza at BlueFrog Mumbai, March 2013

Background information
- Also known as: Merlyn
- Born: 1965 (age 60–61)
- Origin: Bombay, India
- Genres: Western_classical, Jazz, Bollywood, World music, Fusion Music
- Occupations: Composer, pianist, music director/ composer/ arranger
- Instrument: Piano
- Years active: 1986–present
- Website: merlindsouza.in

Merlin D'Souza (Merlyn) is an Indian composer and pianist from Mumbai. She is a musician whose work includes composing for film, albums, theatre and advertising. She is based at Bandra, a Mumbai suburb. Formerly the Asian jazz ambassador for Hennessy X.O. – she has toured extensively, from Australia to China, from Europe to the United States (including a stint at the Blue Note, New York).

== Biography ==
Merlin grew up in Bandra, started learning the piano at age 6, became an All India Radio performing artiste at 9, started playing in the church at 12 and bunked college at 18 to score and perform for Noel Godin's musical production (Blood Brothers). She is trained in western classical (Trinity College Performer's Licentiate) and liberated by jazz.

Merlin's journey in theatre as a music director has seen her score for Alyque Padamsee's Romeo and Juliet, Pearl Padamsee's Godspell, Naseeruddin Shah's Julius Caesar and Etienne Coutinho's Jazz, Raell Padamsee's: Sound of Music 2012, GREASE-2013.

Merlin's foray into films as composer, arranger and vocal director has hit the right notes in Kabhi Khushi Kabhie Gham, Road, Bus Yun Hi, Rules: Pyaar Ka Superhit Formula, Prince of Egypt and more.

She has performed with Shubha Mudgal, Trilok Gurtu, Talvin Singh, Taufiq Qureshi, Rakesh Chaurasia.

Merlin sang the Indian national anthem in the Indian Super League. She has also worked with Ranbir Kapoor by directing him to sing the Indian national anthem in the Indian Super League.

In October 2016, Merlin was one of the musical ambassadors for the BMW national tour in India.

In November 2016, Merlin had performed a musical medley along with the acclaimed INDIVA in Bandra.

Through 2018, Merlin is only pianist after Yanni to have performed at the Taj Mahal.

== Discography ==
- Soul Yatra (2009) – Charting a soundscape that fuses raga influenced melodic lines, Indian rhythm patterns, groovy arrangements and oodles of fluid piano work, Soul Yatra also features guest performances by the likes of Taufiq Qureshi, Rakesh Chaurasia, Mukul Dongre, Karl Peters, Hamsika Iyer and Vivienne Pocha.
- Koshish by Underscore Records – Shubha Mudgal, Merlin DSouza, Sudhir Nayak, Murad Ali, Benoni Soans, and Aneesh Pradhan

Released her solo album "SOUL YATRA" with Bluefrog records and Sony BMG.Recent album release as composer /producer for INDIVA with Crescendo and Universal Music Group.

== Filmography ==
- Bambai Meri Jaan - 2024 - Merlin continued her father's legacy through musical stories on film, 35-odd years later. She, as a music composer, made a superhit Bollywood song 'TOD MOD' from Bambai Meri Jaan with her Dad's old composition
- Kabhi Khushi Kabhie Gham – Merlin played, arranged and conducted for Karan Johar's superhit film 'K3G'
- Road – With music director Sandesh Shandilya
- Bas Yun Hi - with Rajeev
- Prince of Egypt – Merlin was the vocal director for the animated feature film 'Prince of Egypt' (Hindi version).
- Lion King – Merlin was the music director, arranger and programmer for the Hindi version of Disney's famous animated movie 'Lion King'.
- Ralph Breaks the Internet by Disney
- Bombay Boys – Merlin and Asif Ali Beg teamed up to compose an OST for Kaizad Gustad's film starring Rahul Bose, Naveen Andrews and Naseeruddin Shah.
- Other works where she has been vocal director, arranger and programmer – Agnivarsha: The Fire and the Rain, Piya Basanti, Socha Na Tha, Gangaajal, Rules: Pyaar Ka Superhit Formula, Band of Boys, Tum Milo Toh Sahi
