= Bas Yun Hi =

2003 film

- Directed by: Raja Krishna Menon
- Written by: Raja Krishna Menon; Pratap Raju; Subbu
- Produced by: Raja Krishna Menon; Pratap Raju
- Starring: Purab Kohli; Nandita Das
- Cinematography: Jehangir Choudhary
- Edited by: Steven H. Bernard
- Music by: Rajeev-Merlin
- Release date: 14 February 2003
- Country: India
- Language: Hindi

Bas Yun Hi (transl. Just like that) is a 2003 Indian Hindi-language romantic comedy film directed by Raja Krishna Menon. The film stars Purab Kohli, of Channel V fame, and Nandita Das.

== Cast ==
- Purab Kohli as Aditya
- Nandita Das as Veda
- Rajiv Gopalakrishnan as Rohan
- Sameer Malhotra as Kabir
- Sandhya Shetty as Saraswathy alias Sara
- Tannishtha Chatterjee as Sona
- Parmita Katkar as Tara

== Soundtrack ==
- Bas Yun Hi - Mehnaaz
- Ek Ajnabi Haseena Se - KK
- Kaise Kahoon Kya Ho Gaya - Shaan, Vivenne Pocha
- Jao Na Yun Chodkar - KK
- Ittefaq - Mehnaaz
- Ye Kaisa Ehsaas Hai - KK, Mahalaxmi Iyer
- Mix Yun Hi - Abhay Rumde

== Reception ==
Rediff wrote that "Though shorter in length than a commercial movie, it still drags. The filmmakers may have tried to portray a slice of urban life. They probably did not realise it would take more than just a prank to show its true colours". Bollywood Hungama gave the film a rating of one out of five stars and wrote that "On the whole, BAS YUN HI neither entertains, nor enlightens. It may appeal to a very, very small segment of cinegoers ï¿½ the college crowd only ï¿½ but even they won't come out feeling satiated. Poor".
