= International Collective of Female Cinematographers =

Professional society

The International Collective of Female⁺ Cinematographers (The ICF⁺C) is a collective of professional cinematographers from around the world that works to advance the careers of female cinematographers by connecting with filmmakers and production teams to find a qualified crew. In 2018 the top-grossing 100 films only 2% of them hired women cinematographers. That number was only up to 7% in 2022. The collective was founded in 2016 by a group of female cinematographers who wanted to act as allies within the film industry and provide each other with community support and advocacy. Notable members include Nancy Schreiber, Kira Kelly, Cynthia Pusheck, Amy Vincent, Natalie Kingston, and Ellen Kuras.

ICF⁺C members personally identify as simply "Cinematographers"—without gender qualifiers. However, as a group, they have found it helpful to organize around gender until such time as women cease to be perceived as statistical anomalies or token hires behind the lens. In 2022 the group updated their name to include the " ⁺ " after "female" to reflect an expansion on the outdated language. They emphasize that the group exists to support and uplift cinematographers who are in a position to actively experience gender discrimination in their careers.

The collective holds events for members to network, to explore various cinematography related topics, and new technology. Globally, they link film productions to a variety of Cinematographers with specialties ranging from narrative film, documentary, commercials, music videos, and virtual reality.
