= Raja Krishna Menon =

Indian film writer, director and producer

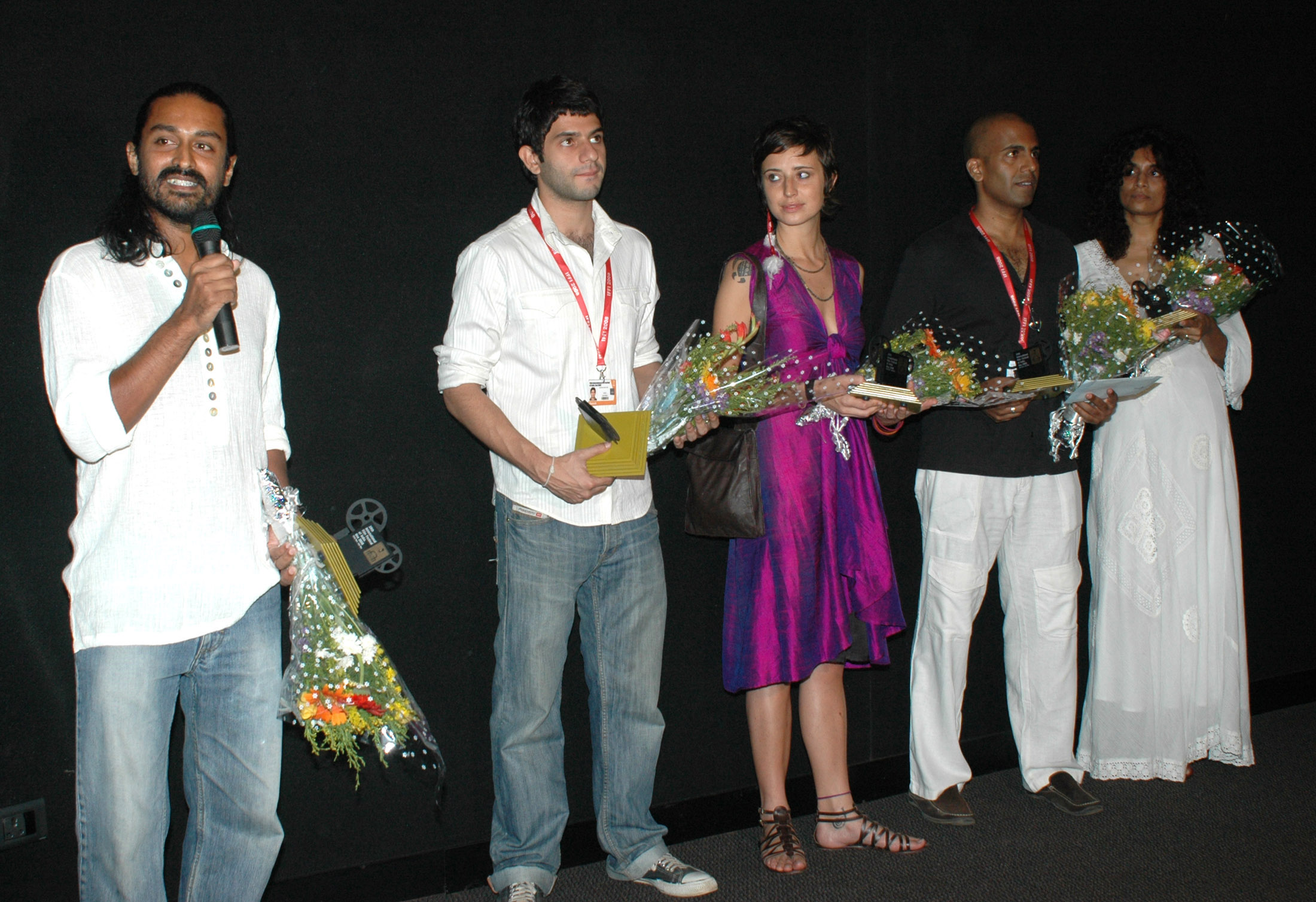
- Menon, IFFI (2008)
- Born: Thrissur, Kerala, India
- Education: Bachelor of Science (Chemistry)
- Alma mater: The Valley School, Bangalore; Christ College, Bangalore
- Occupations: Film writer; Film director; Film producer
- Parents: T. P. Madhavan; Girija Menon

Raja Krishna Menon is an Indian film writer, director and producer. He started as an advertisement director and later moved to feature films. He has directed five Hindi films.

== Early life and background ==
Menon was born in Thrissur, Kerala and brought up in Bangalore. He is the son of Malayalam actor T. P. Madhavan. He spent a major part of his childhood in Kerala. He studied at The Valley School and finished a Bachelor of Science degree with a Chemistry Major from Christ College, Bangalore. Although a science student, Menon was involved in creative pursuits throughout college. He was a debater, quizzer, and writer and won many college festival competitions.

== Career ==
On receiving his degree, Menon assisted D. Radhakrishnan, an ad film director and still photographer. He moved to Mumbai in 1993 and by 1996, was managing the business for writer/director Sanjeev Khamgaonkar. Towards the end of 1996, Menon went independent, working out of an office that director Mukul Anand gave him. He started editing commercials and got into the business of creating trailers for Bollywood films, shooting and creating trailers that were not just an edit of the film footage. His early films included Raja Hindustani, Army and Loafer. Menon then moved on to advertisement commercials and has made over 300 commercials till date.

In 2003, Menon wrote, directed and produced his first feature film titled Bas Yun Hi starring Purab Kohli and Nandita Das. He continued with advertising from 2003 – 2008. In 2009 he wrote, produced and directed his second feature film Barah Aana starring Naseeruddin Shah, Vijay Raaz, and Italian actress Violante Placido. The film was a critical success. Barah Aana was selected in international film festivals, including the Chicago International Film Festival.

Post these films he continued to produce commercials and documentaries for Oglivy, JWT, Creative Land Asia, BBH, and Ulka in partnership with Janani Ravichandran under their banner ‘Bandra West Pictures’.

Menon's third film Airlift was released on 22 January 2016 starring Akshay Kumar and Nimrit Kaur in the lead. The film received critical acclaim and box office success.

He is committed to direct Shahid Kapoor in the yet untitled Dingko Singh's biopic.

== Family ==
T. P. Madhavan, the acclaimed actor and father of Raja Krishna Menon, died at the age of 88 in Pathanapuram, Kollam. He died after working for decades, leaving behind a lasting legacy in the Malayalam film industry.

== Filmography ==
Year	Film	Director	Writer	Producer	Notes
2003	Bas Yun Hi	Yes	Yes	Yes	
2009	Barah Aana	Yes	Yes	Yes	
2016	Airlift	Yes	Yes		
2017	Chef	Yes		Yes	
2023	Pippa	Yes	Yes		
