= Saddam Beach =

- Village
- Location in Kerala, India Saddam Beach (India)
- Coordinates: 11°2′19″N 75°51′6″E
- Country: India
- State: Kerala

Languages
  - Official: Malayalam, English
- Time zone: UTC+5:30 (IST)

Saddam Beach is a fishing village in the Malappuram district of the Indian state of Kerala. The village is made up of a two kilometre (1¼ mi) coastal belt between Puthenkadapuram and Kettungal in Parappanangadi. The village is named after former Iraqi president Saddam Hussein, in an act of solidarity after the 1991 Gulf War. The beach name was suggested by Indian maids working in the gulf, especially Kuwait.

== Etymology ==
The village used to be called Tipu Sultan Beach after the Mysore king Tippu Sultan who took an aggressive stance against the British colonial forces during the late 18th century. Since the Gulf War of 1991, the villagers have decided to rename the village to its present name, expressing solidarity with Iraqi leader Saddam Hussein. The villagers, mostly Muslim, claim to be inspired by "Saddam and his fight against policies of the United States.

== History ==
The coastal hamlet that is now Saddam Beach shot into prominence when it was renamed after the Iraqi leader. The villagers of the region have since been particularly vocal about their admiration of Saddam and his 'anti-imperialist' stance. The United States-led invasion of Iraq was received with much condemnation. In 2003, expressing anguish over the renaming of "Saddam International Airport" to "Baghdad International Airport", Saddam supporters raised a large signpost on the beach with the message "Welcome to Saddam Beach".

== 2003 Gulf War ==
During the course of the invasion of Baghdad, the village witnessed many anti-American and anti-British demonstrations. Goods made in these countries were generally boycotted and even thrown into the sea. Many of the villagers who had work in Gulf countries were forced to return to Saddam Beach as their jobs were lost due to the aftermath of the Gulf War, further increasing animosity to the West. Local residents expressed their protest by installing large cut-outs and posters of Saddam, accompanied by Iraqi flags, along the roadside.

In November 2006, villagers reacted to the death sentence of Saddam Hussein by staging a protest rally, mouthing slogans against American President George W. Bush. Around fifty people, including women and children, participated in the march.

== Saddam supporters ==
On 30 December 2006, angry supporters of Saddam Hussein gathered at the beach, and shouted slogans denouncing US President George W. Bush, describing the execution of Saddam Hussein as "cruel".

== Transportation ==
Saddam Beach village connects to other parts of India through Parappanangadi town. National highway No.66 passes through Ramanattukara and the northern stretch connects to Goa and Mumbai. The southern stretch connects to Cochin and Trivandrum. State Highway No.28 starts from Nilambur and connects to Ooty, Mysore and Bangalore through Highways.12,29 and 181. The nearest airport is at Kozhikode. The nearest major railway station is at Parappanangadi.
