= 1990 airlift of Indians from Kuwait =

Emergency evacuation after the Iraqi invasion

Airlift of Indians from Kuwait
- Part of Invasion of Kuwait and the Gulf War
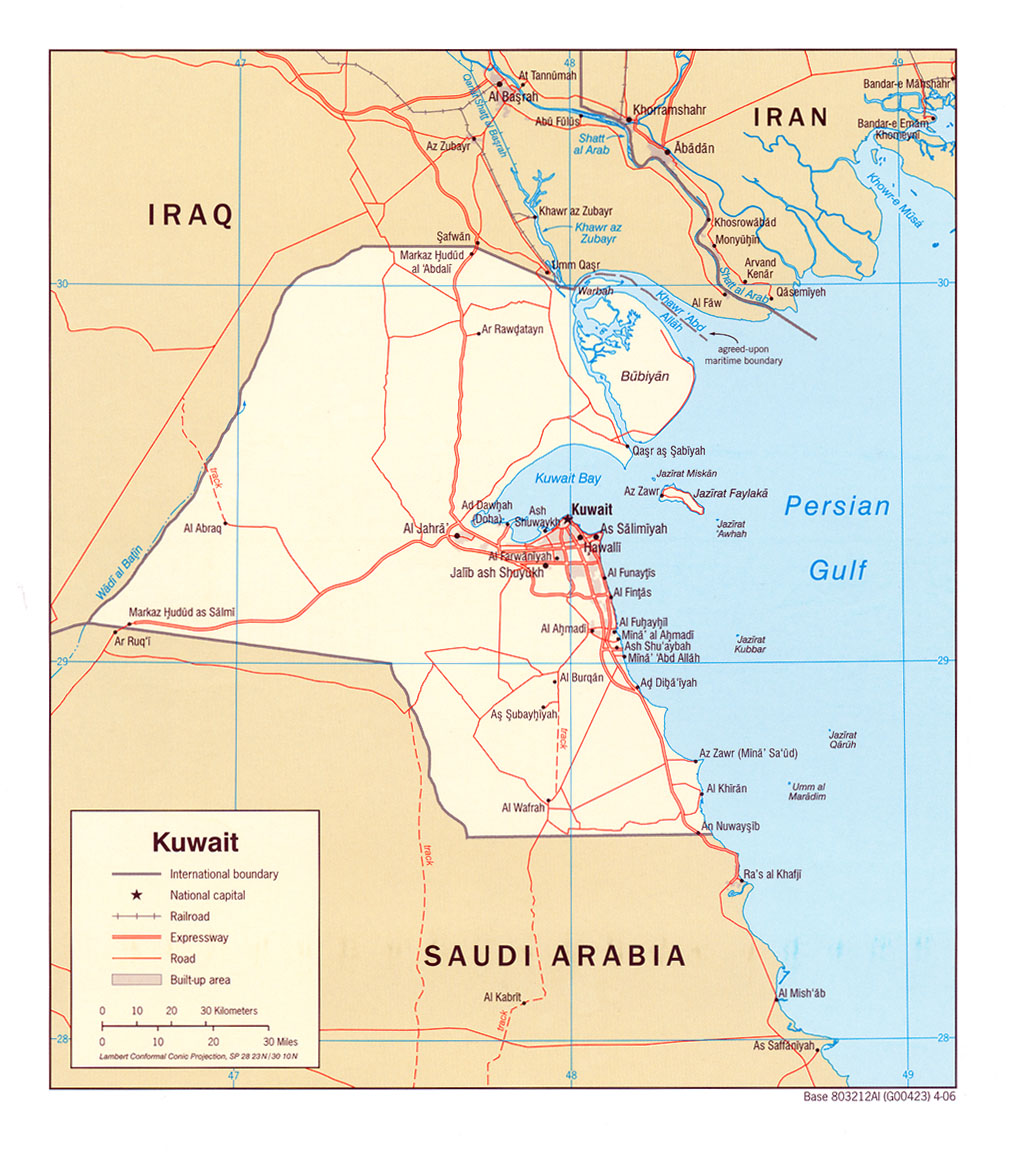
- Map of Kuwait
- Type: Emergency evacuation
- Location: Kuwait
- Planned by: Ministry of External Affairs
- Objective: Humanitarian relief
- Date: 13 August 1990 - 20 October 1990
- Executed by: Air India, Indian Airlines, Indian Air Force
- Outcome: More than 170,000 Indian citizens evacuated.

The 1990 airlift of Indians from Kuwait was carried out from August 13, 1990, to October 20, 1990, after the Iraqi invasion of Kuwait. Air India helped evacuate 170,000 people by civil airline. The operation was carried out before the Persian Gulf War in 1990 to evacuate Indian migrant workers from Kuwait. Foreign Minister I.K. Gujral was instrumental in getting Iraq to co-operate on these efforts. Following this operation, Air India, the flag carrier of India, entered the Guinness Book of World Records for the most people evacuated by a civil airliner. Mathunny Mathews, Harbajan Singh Vedi, Abey Varicad, N.V.K. Warrier, Ali Hussain, Narinder Singh Sethi, and few others based in Kuwait helped immensely in the evacuation efforts of fellow Indians.

== Background ==
The invasion of Kuwait started on August 2, 1990, and within two days of combat, most of the Kuwaiti Armed Forces were either overrun by the Iraqi Republican Guard or fell back to Saudi Arabia and Bahrain. The Emirate of Kuwait was annexed, and Saddam Hussein announced a few days later that it was the 19th province of Iraq. More than 170,000 Indians were stranded on Kuwaiti soil.

== Response ==
Initial efforts were made by the Government of India to evacuate nationals by military aircraft. However, due to difficulties in air-space clearances the switch was made to civilian aircraft. India had initially requested permission to evacuate its citizens by Air India but the request was not approved by the UN and the government of Kuwait in exile. India was required to use planes supplied to them under the UN banner. Complications arose due to the significantly higher number of nationals requiring evacuation, a lack of travel documents and poor communications. The airlift was completed before the start of Operation Desert Storm. About 170,000 people were evacuated (airlifted) from Amman, Jordan, to Bombay – a distance of 4,117 km (2558 mi) – by Air India, operating 488 flights in association with Indian Airlines, from August 18, 1990, to October 20, 1990 – lasting 63 days.

Buses were also used after winning Baghdad's approval to ferry Indians through Basra and Baghdad to Amman in Jordan.

== Popular culture ==
The event was the basis for the 2016 film Airlift starring Akshay Kumar, who played a character inspired by the works of Mathunny Mathews, Harbajan Singh Vedi, Abey Varicad, NVK Warrier, Ali Hussain and many others.
