= K. P. Fabian =

Indian diplomat

Kalarickal Pranchu Fabian
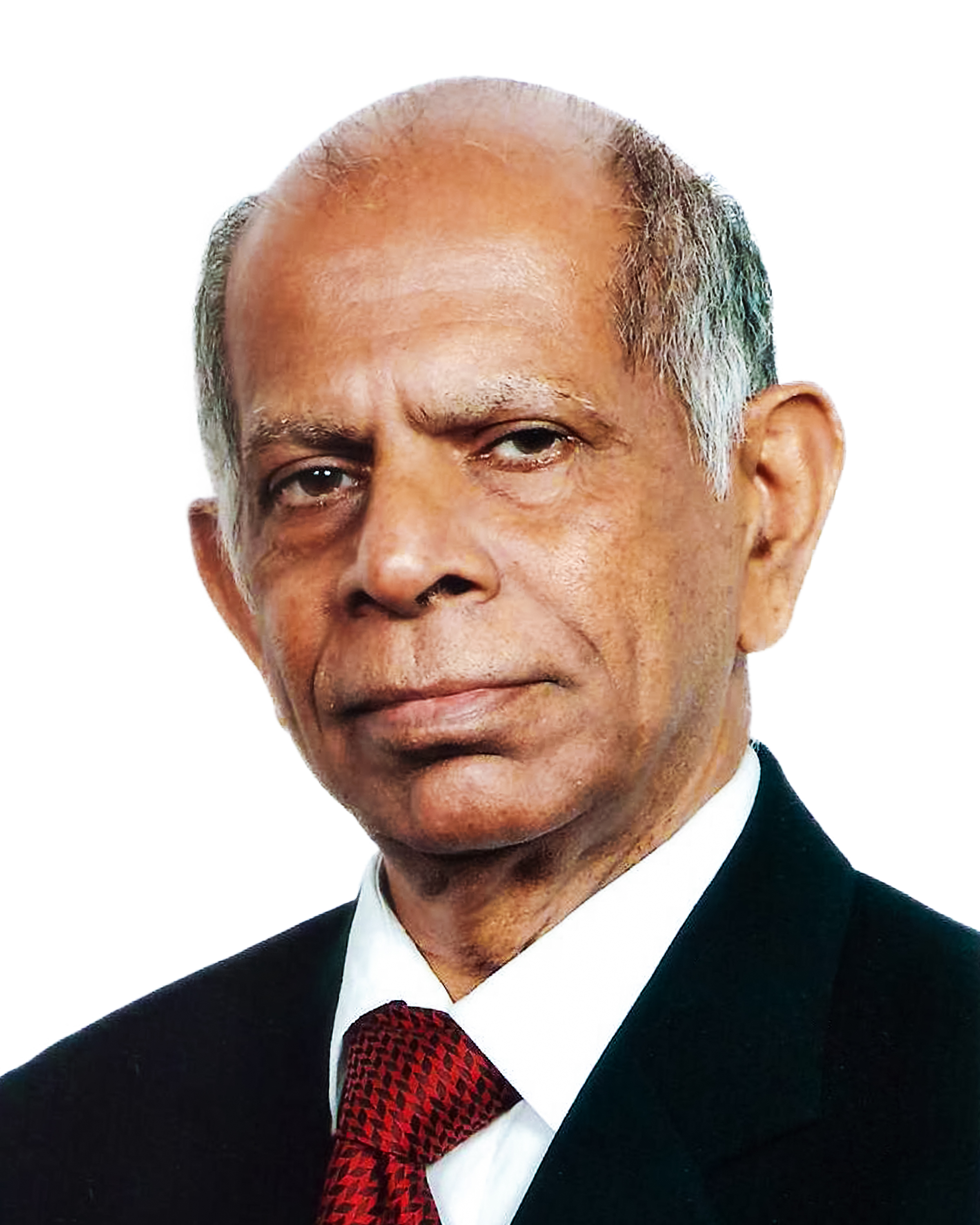

Indian Foreign Service
- In office 1964–2000

Indian ambassador to Qatar
- In office November 17, 1992 – November 1, 1996
- Preceded by: Ramesh Chand Shukla
- Succeeded by: Rajamani Lakshmi Narayan

Indian ambassador to Italy es:Anexo:Embajadores de la India en Italia
- In office September 10, 1999 – 2000
- Preceded by: es:Kamal Nain Bakshi
- Succeeded by: Siddharth Singh

Personal details
- Born: September 23, 1940 (age 85) Udayamperoor, Ernakulam District, Kingdom of Cochin, British Raj (now Kerala, India)
- Occupation: Diplomat
- Website: www.ambassador-fabian.com

Kalarickal Pranchu Fabian (born 23 September 1940) is an Indian Diplomat, author and political commentator who served in the Indian Foreign Service between 1964 and 2000, during which he was posted to Madagascar, Austria, Iran, Sri Lanka, Canada, Finland, Qatar and Italy. He is known for his contributions to international diplomacy and commentary on global affairs.

== Early life ==
KP Fabian’s full name is Kalarickal Pranchu Fabian. He was born on 23 September 1940 in Udayamperoor, Ernakulam District (then Kingdom of Cochin, British Raj; now Kerala, India). He joined the Indian Foreign Service (IFS) in 1964 and served until 2000. Over his career he was posted in various countries including Madagascar, Austria, Iran, Sri Lanka, Canada, Finland, Qatar and Italy. He served as Ambassador of India to Qatar (1992-1996) and later to Italy (1999-2000).

== Career ==
During his time in the diplomatic service, he spent three years in Iran (from 1976 to 1979), witnessing the Iranian Revolution first hand. As Joint Secretary (Gulf), Fabian coordinated the evacuation of over 176,000 Indian nationals from Iraq and Kuwait in 1990–91.

His multilateral experience includes representing India at the United Nations Industrial Development Organization, International Atomic Energy Agency, International Civil Aviation Organization, Food and Agriculture Organization, World Food Programme and the International Fund for Agricultural Development.

He is also the author of two books, Commonsense on the War on Iraq, which was published in 2003 and Diplomacy: Indian Style. Even while in service, Fabian wrote and spoke on international affairs, mainly at universities in Madagascar, Austria, Iran, Sri Lanka, Canada, Finland, Qatar and Italy. The first address he delivered was on Mahatma Gandhi in 1969 at The Charles de Gaulle University, Tananarive, Madagascar. His presentation on the North-South Dialogue was published as a monograph by McGill University, Montreal (1983).

In the corporate sector, for three years starting from 2002, he was on the board of Rashtriya Chemicals and Fertilizers in Mumbai and concurrently chaired the Audit Committee of the Board. He was on the board of the Syndicate Bank from 2003-2006. He was a visiting professor at Jawaharlal Nehru University, New Delhi from 2003-04. He held the position of KPS Menon Chair at Mahatma Gandhi University, Kottayam from 2012-13. He was also the Chairman of Banyan Tree Holdings, Chennai. Currently he is a board member of The Hope Project, New Delhi and Professor, at the Indian Society of International Law, New Delhi. He is also the Chief Advisor of Minerva Model United Nations founded by Arsh Arora and Yash Maheshwari.

== Evacuation of Indians from Kuwait ==
During the Invasion of Kuwait by Saddam Hussein's Iraq Fabian worked closely with Gujral then Joint Secretary (Gulf Division, Ministry of External Affairs), KP Fabian coordinated the evacuation initiative. This involved working with officers across ministries working in the Gulf, and respond to the needs of the stranded people in Kuwait. He also was personally responsible in keeping the Air India ready for the emergency operation. The 1990 airlift of Indians from Kuwait was carried out from August 13, 1990 to October 20, 1990 after the Invasion of Kuwait. Air India helped evacuate 175,000 people by civil airliners. The operation was carried out before the Persian Gulf War in 1990 to evacuate Indian expatriates from Kuwait. Those stranded were evacuated from Amman, Jordan, to Mumbai by Air India, operating 488 flights in coordination with Indian Airlines.

== Post-retirement roles and commentary ==
After retiring from the Indian Foreign Service, Fabian has been active as a commentator on international affairs, contributing articles and analysis on topics such as india's diplomatic relations with U.S., Bangladesh and Canada and contemporary geopolitical issues.

He has written on foreign policy questions in outlets, discussing India’s diplomatic positioning and responses to international tensions.

== Books Authored ==
- The Commonsense on the War on Iraq K. P. Fabian (2003)
- Diplomacy: Indian Style K. P. Fabian (2012)
- The Arab Spring That Was and Wasn’t (2022)

== See also ==
- Syed Akbaruddin
