= Purab Kohli =

Indian actor and model (b. 1979)

- Purab Kohli at a Photoshoot
- Born: 23 February 1979 (age 47); Mumbai, Maharashtra, India
- Occupations: Actor, model, video jockey
- Years active: 1998–present
- Spouse: Lucy Payton (m. 2016)
- Children: 2
- Relatives: Vishal Anand (uncle)

Purab Kohli is an Indian actor, model and former video jockey. He has won the Filmfare Special Jury Award for Rock On!!

== Career ==
=== Television ===
Kohli started his career as an actor with the 1998 television show Hip Hip Hurray on Zee TV and earned recognition through video jockeying on Channel V. He then hosted the travel show Gone India where he toured India on budget trips.

In 2005, he appeared in an episode of the TV fantasy sitcom Shararat, as the genius science student Dhumketu.

In 2010 he anchored the Zee TV music talent hunt Sa Re Ga Ma Pa Singing Superstar. In 2011, he was lead in the first season of Life Mein Ek Baar a television show on Fox Traveller. In 2013, he hosted the show Terra Quiz on National Geographic Channel.

He has also featured in television ads for Colgate, Pizza Hut, Compaq Presario, Amaron Batteries and Castrol.

In 2014, he became one of the contestants in season 7 of the reality TV show Jhalak Dikhhla Jaa.

Kohli had a key supporting role in Sense8 a series on Netflix by The Wachowskis with the finale premiering in June 2018.

=== Films ===
Kohli made his acting debut in films with Bas Yun Hi (2003) starring opposite Nandita Das. He has also acted in other films like Supari (2003), Vastu Shastra (2004), and 13th Floor (2005). His performance in My Brother... Nikhil (2005) got him recognition. Kohli then went on to star in Mahesh Bhatt's 2006 film Woh Lamhe and as a villain again in Bhatt's 2007 film Awarapan. He also acted in Rock On!! (2008) along with Farhan Akhtar, Luke Kenny and Arjun Rampal. Kohli's work in Rock On garnered him a Special Jury Mention at the 2009 Filmfare Awards in March 2009. Kohli then starred opposite Nandita Das again in the 2010–11 film I Am which was directed by Onir, who had previously directed him in My Brother Nikhil. He also contributed financially in the making of this film. Purab played the role of a divorced lawyer in the 2012 movie Kuch Spice To Make It Meetha with actress Nauheed Cyrusi and composer Kavish Mishra. Purab's 2014 movie Jal is a story based on villagers' fight for water and dignity.

=== Web series ===
Purab Kohli appeared as Angad Shergil in the Voot web series It's Not That Simple (2018), with other featured cast Swara Bhaskar, Sumeet Vyas, Vivan Bhatena, Manasi Rachh, Neha Chauhan, Karan Veer Mehra, Devika Vatsa, Rohan Shah, Jia Vaidya.

In 2019, Kohli was cast in Sujoy Ghosh directed webseries Typewriter, which streamed on Netflix in July.

In the same year, Kohil appeared in the Hotstar web series of 2019 Out of Love, playing Akarsh in a five-episode series of betrayal, heartbreak, blackmail and revenge. The series also starred Rasika Dugal and Soni Razdan.

== Personal life ==
Kohli's father Harsh Kohli is a hotelier and film producer who had produced the Vinod Khanna and Rekha starrer Aap Ki Khatir. Purab's mother, Indu Kohli is a corporate trainer. He did his schooling at St. Stanislaus High School in Bandra, Mumbai, and at The Bishop's School, Pune, Maharashtra. He switched his education faculty from Science to Commerce and finally to Arts and studied Economics, Psychology and Literature. He joined a flying school to be a pilot, but did not continue.

Kohli married his long time girlfriend, a British yoga teacher named Lucy Paton in 2016. They now live in London with their daughter, Inaya and son, Osian.

Former actor Bhisham Kohli a.k.a. Vishal Anand is his paternal uncle. Kohli's paternal grandmother was Dev Anand's sister (thus making Kohli the late actor's grand-nephew). Filmmaker Shekhar Kapur (son of another of Dev Anand's sisters) is thus, Kohli's uncle.

== Filmography ==
Key
†	Denotes films that have not yet been released

Year	Title	Role	Notes
2003	Bas Yun Hi	Aditya	
2003	Supari	Chicken	
2004	Vaastu Shastra	Murli	
2005	13th Floor	Rajat	
2005	My Brother…Nikhil	Nigel De Costa	
2006	Bas Ek Pal		
2006	Woh Lamhe	Sam a.k.a. Sammy	
2007	Awarapan	Munna R. Malik	
2008	Rock On!!	Kedar 'KD' 'Killer Drummer' Zaveri	Filmfare Special Jury Award (certificate)
2009	Yeh Mera India	Nachiket Joshi	
2010	Hide & Seek	Om Jaiswal	
2011	Turning 30	Jai Saxena	
2011	I Am	Suraj	
2011	Life Mein Ek Baar	Self	Fox Traveller
2012	Fatso!	Navin	
2012	10ml LOVE		
2012	Kuch Spice To Make It Meetha	Akshay Rana	Short film
2013	Gangoobai	Waman	
2014	Shaadi Ke Side Effects	Shekhar	
2014	Jal	Bakka	
2015–2018	Sense8	Rajan Rasal	Netflix series
2016	Airlift	Ibrahim Durrani	
2016	Rock On 2	Kedar Zaveri (KD-Killer Drummer)	
2016	P.O.W.- Bandi Yuddh Ke	Naib Subedar Sartaj Singh	
2017	Noor	Ayan Banerjee	
2018	It's Not That Simple	Angad Shergil	Aired on Voot
2019	Typewriter	Inspector Ravi Anand	Web series on Netflix
2019–2021	Out of Love	Akarsh	Web series on Hotstar
2019	Mission Mangal	Vivek Pillai	
2020	London Confidential	Arjun	film on ZEE5
2021	Bob Biswas	Bubai	Special appearance film on ZEE5
2021	The Matrix Resurrections	Zen	English film
2022	London Files	Amar Roy	Web Series on Voot
2022	Criminal Justice: Adhura Sach	Neeraj	Web series on Disney+Hotstar
2023	Blind	The Driver / Serial Killer	
2024	36 Days	Rishi aka Dr. Rishikesh Jaykar	Web Series on Sony Liv
2025	The Great Shamsuddin Family	Amitav	JioHotstar film
