= Cinematographer =

Creative head of a motion picture's camera and lighting decisions

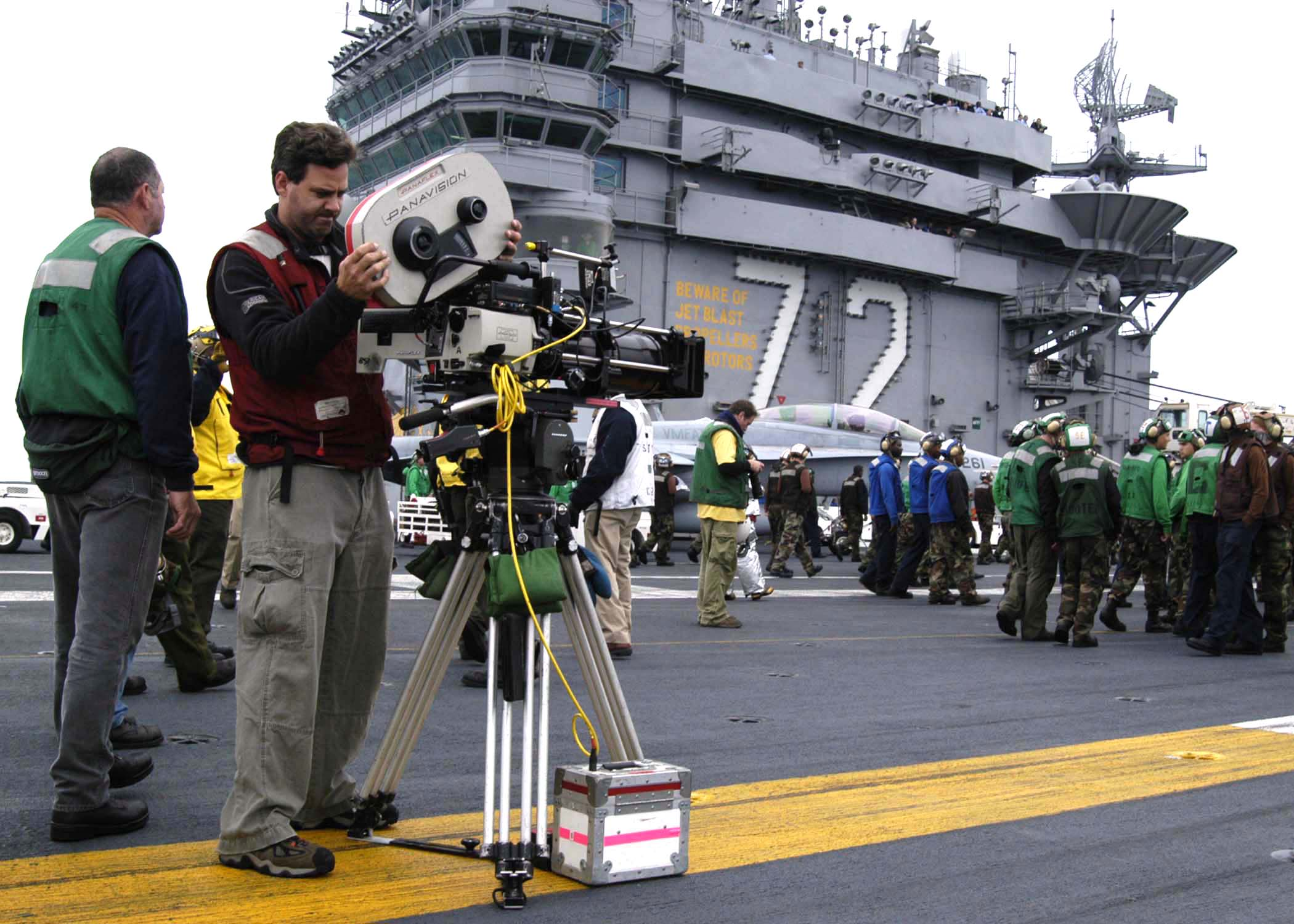
A camera crew sets up for scenes to be filmed on the flight deck for the motion picture Stealth with the crew of the Nimitz-class aircraft carrier USS Abraham Lincoln (CVN-72).

The cinematographer or director of photography (sometimes shortened to DP or DOP) is the person responsible for the recording of a film, television production, music video or other live-action piece. The cinematographer is the chief of the camera and light crews working on such projects. They are normally responsible for making artistic and technical decisions related to the image and for selecting the camera, film stock, lenses, filters, etc. Furthermore, the cinematographer is commonly involved with the color grading to shape the final look of a film. The study and practice of this field are referred to as cinematography.

The cinematographer is a subordinate of the director, tasked with capturing a scene in accordance with the director's vision. Relations between the cinematographer and director vary. In some instances, the director will allow the cinematographer complete independence, while in others, the director allows little to none, even going so far as to specify exact camera placement and lens selection. Such a level of involvement is less common when the director and cinematographer have become comfortable with each other. The director will typically convey to the cinematographer what is wanted from a scene visually and allow the cinematographer latitude in achieving that effect.

The scenes recorded by the cinematographer are passed to the film editor for editing.

== History ==
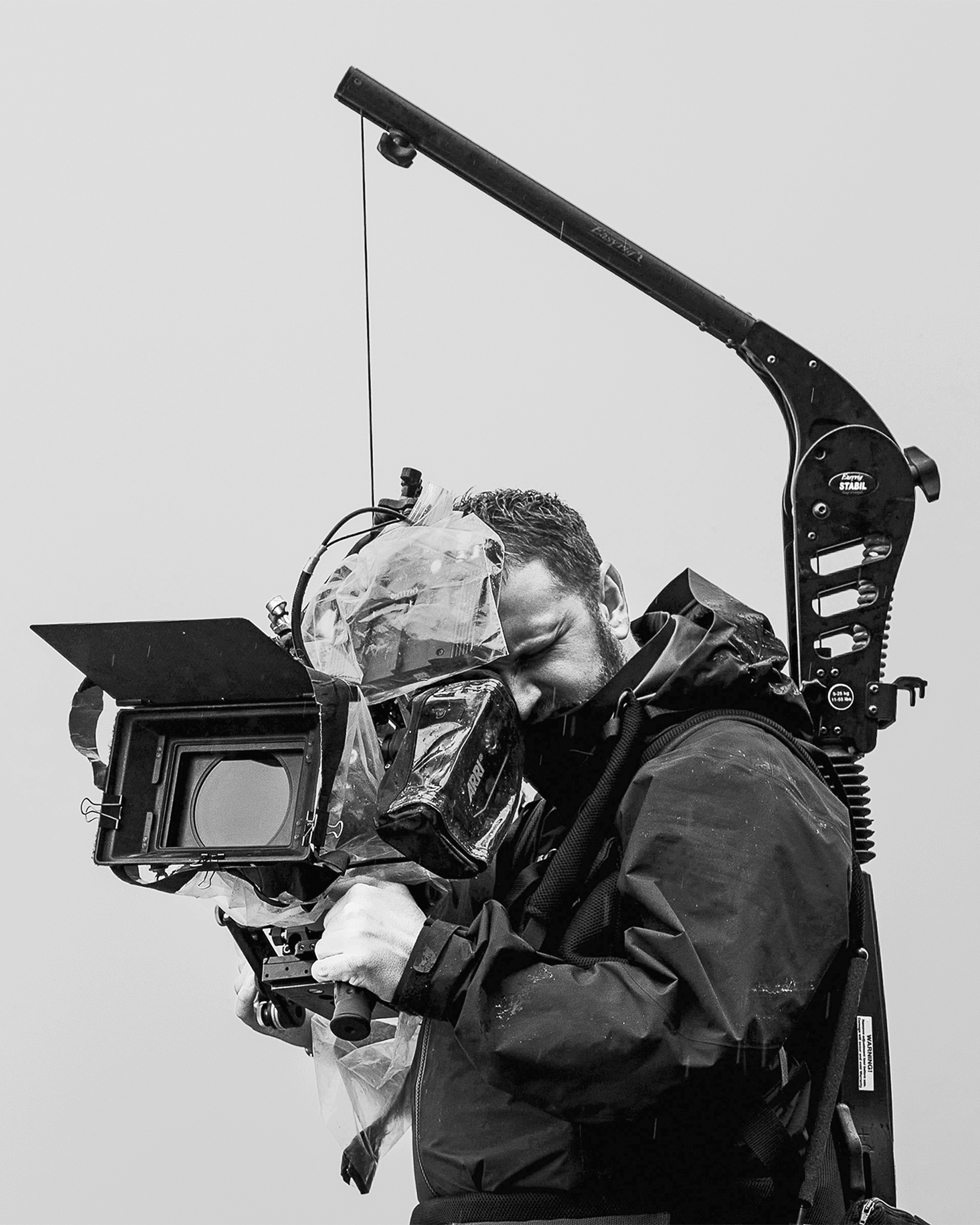
Outdoor gear protects the camera operator and camera.

In the infancy of motion pictures, the cinematographer was usually also the director and the person physically handling the camera. As the art form and technology evolved, a separation between director and camera operator emerged. With the advent of artificial lighting and faster (more light-sensitive) film stocks, in addition to technological advancements in optics, the technical aspects of cinematography necessitated a specialist in that area.

Cinematography was key during the silent movie era; with no sound apart from background music and no dialogue, the films depended on lighting, acting, and set.

The American Society of Cinematographers (ASC) was formed in 1919 in Hollywood, and was the first trade society for cinematographers. Similar societies were formed in other countries, for example the British Society of Cinematographers (BSC). Their aims include the recognition of the cinematographer's contribution to the art and science of motion picture making.

== Roles in the Photography department ==
Cinematographer or Director of Photography (DOP)
Leads the department as well as it creates the visual atmosphere of the production.
Camera Operator
Controls the camera, presses the record button and makes sure every aspect discussed previously appears through the viewfinder. Sometimes the DOP can also be a camera operator, but most cinematographers assign the role to another person.
First/Second Assistant camera
They are also known as 1st or 2nd AC, and their responsibility is to make sure the right lens is being used, as well as adjusting the camera's focus during a take.
Camera auxiliary
Controls the equipment that involves the camera or cameras, this includes tripods, c-stands, video monitors, etc.
Video assistant operators
Displays the images recorded on set, so that the director and other crew members can watch it and evaluate the shot.
Head electrician
Also known as gaffer, they are in charge of designing, and sometimes executing, the lighting plan. This plan has to be approved by the DOP so it follows the visual idea the production is carrying.
Electricians
Follow the directions of the head electrician and develop the more technical side of illumination.
Key Grip
Through the DOP's directions, assembles the camera movement plan. The key grip should know perfectly the camera disposal as well as the action on the scene to lead the grips to assemble the camera rails, dollies, tripods, cranes, etc.
Grips
Assemble the camera rails, dollies, tripods, cranes, etc. under the lead of the Key Grip, to ensure the camera movement plan is being followed correctly.
Unit still photographer
Takes photographs during the filming process. These pictures can be used with many goals: for publicity, to have a multimedia record of the production process, or to keep track of the scenes to ensure there are no continuity mistakes.

== Societies and trade organizations ==
There are a number of national associations of cinematographers that represent members (irrespective of their official titles) and are dedicated to the advancement of cinematography, including:

- the American Society of Cinematographers (A.S.C.)
- the Austrian Association of Cinematographers (A.A.C.)
- the Brazilian Cinematographers Society (A.B.C.)
- the International Collective of Women Cinematographers (ICFC)
- the Canadian Society of Cinematographers (C.S.C.)
- the Czech Society of Cinematographers (AČK)
- the Cinévore Madagascar
- the Finnish Society of Cinematographers (F.S.C.)
- the Guild of British Camera Technicians (G.B.C.T.)
- the British Society of Cinematographers (B.S.C.)
- the Australian Cinematographers Society (A.C.S.)
- the Cinematographers Guild of Korea (C.G.K.)
- the Filipino Society of Cinematographers (F.S.C.)
- the French Society of Cinematographers (A.F.C.)
- the Western India Cinematographers Association (W.I.C.A.)
- the Indian Society of Cinematographers (I.S.C.)
- the Indonesian Cinematographers Society (ICS)
- the Italian Society of Cinematographers (A.I.C.)
- the German Society of Cinematographers (BVK)
- the Malaysian Society of Cinematographers (MySC)
- the Netherlands Society of Cinematographers (NSC)
- the Association of Slovak Cinematographers (ASK)
- the South African Society of Cinematographers (S.A.S.C.)
- the Spanish Society of Cinematography Works (A.E.C)

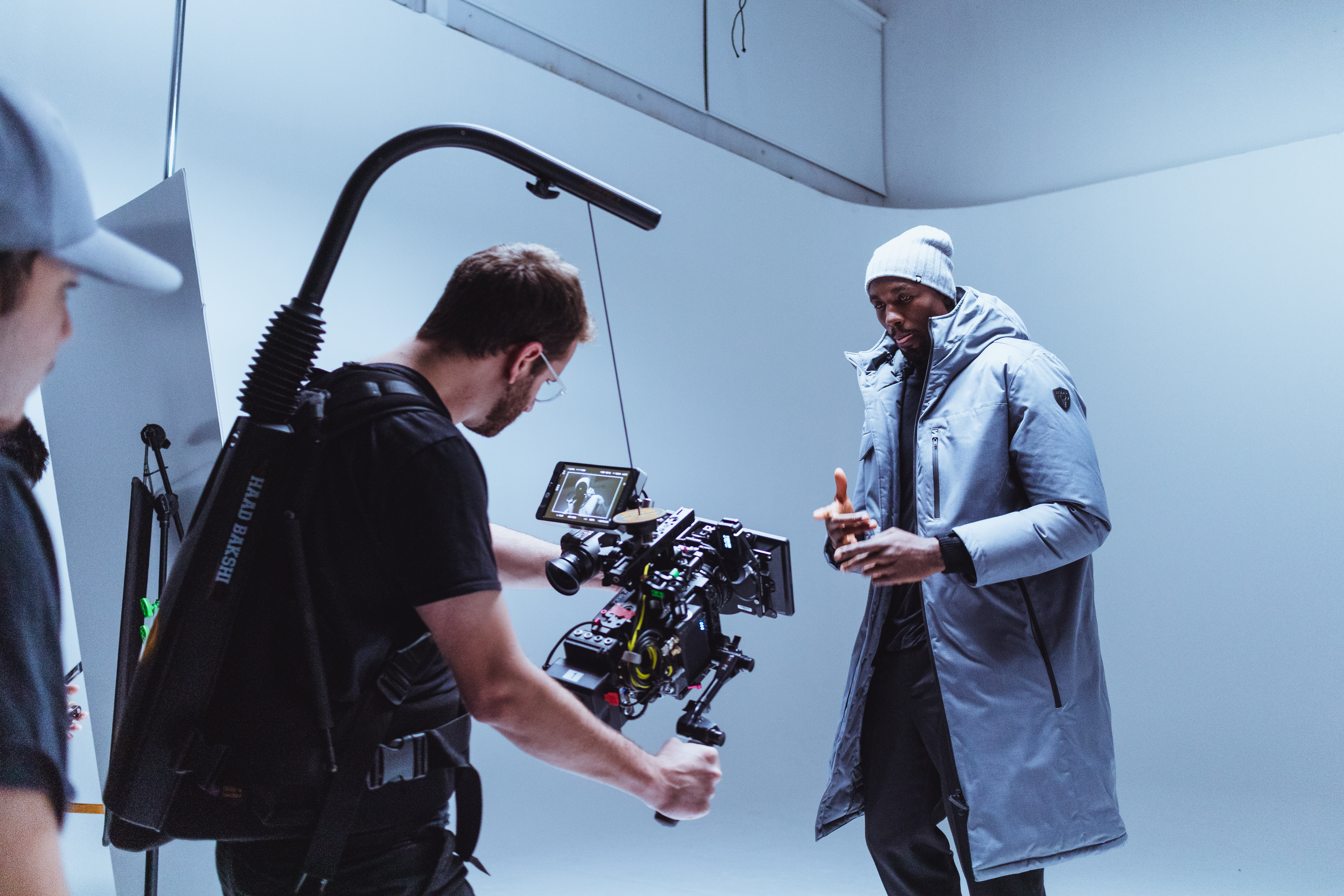
Camera operator with support rig.

- the Polish Society of Cinematographers (PSC)
- the Swedish Society of Cinematographers (F.S.F)
- the International Federation of Cinematographers (IMAGO)
- the Uruguayan Society of Cinematographers (S.C.U)
- the Argentine Society of Cinematographers (ADF)
- the Lithuanian Association of Cinematographers (LAC)
- Cinematographers XX
- Illuminatrix

The A.S.C. defines cinematography as:

A creative and interpretive process that culminates in the authorship of an original work of art rather than the simple recording of a physical event. Cinematography is not a subcategory of photography. Rather, photography is but one craft that the cinematographer uses in addition to other physical, organizational, managerial, interpretive and image-manipulating techniques to effect one coherent process.

== Noted cinematographers ==
The Academy Award for Best Cinematography is an Academy Award awarded each year to a cinematographer for work on one particular motion picture.

A number of cinematographers have become directors, including Reed Morano who lensed Frozen River and Beyoncé's Lemonade before winning an Emmy for directing The Handmaid's Tale. Barry Sonnenfeld, originally the Coen brothers' DP; Jan de Bont, cinematographer on films such as Die Hard and Basic Instinct, directed Speed and Twister. Nicolas Roeg, cinematographer on films such as The Caretaker (1963) and The Masque of the Red Death (1964), directed Don't Look Now (1973) and The Man Who Fell to Earth (1976). Ellen Kuras, ASC photographed Eternal Sunshine of The Spotless Mind as well as a number of Spike Lee films such as Summer of Sam and He Got Game before directing episodes of Legion and Ozark. In 2014, Wally Pfister, cinematographer on Christopher Nolan's three Batman films, made his directorial debut with Transcendence, whilst British cinematographers Jack Cardiff and Freddie Francis regularly moved between the two positions.

== See also ==
- 3D film
- Camerimage
- Cinematography
- Filmmaking
- Glossary of motion picture terms
- Indian cinematographers
- List of film director and cinematographer collaborations
- List of film formats
- List of motion picture-related topics
