= Arjun (singer) =

Sri Lankan singer

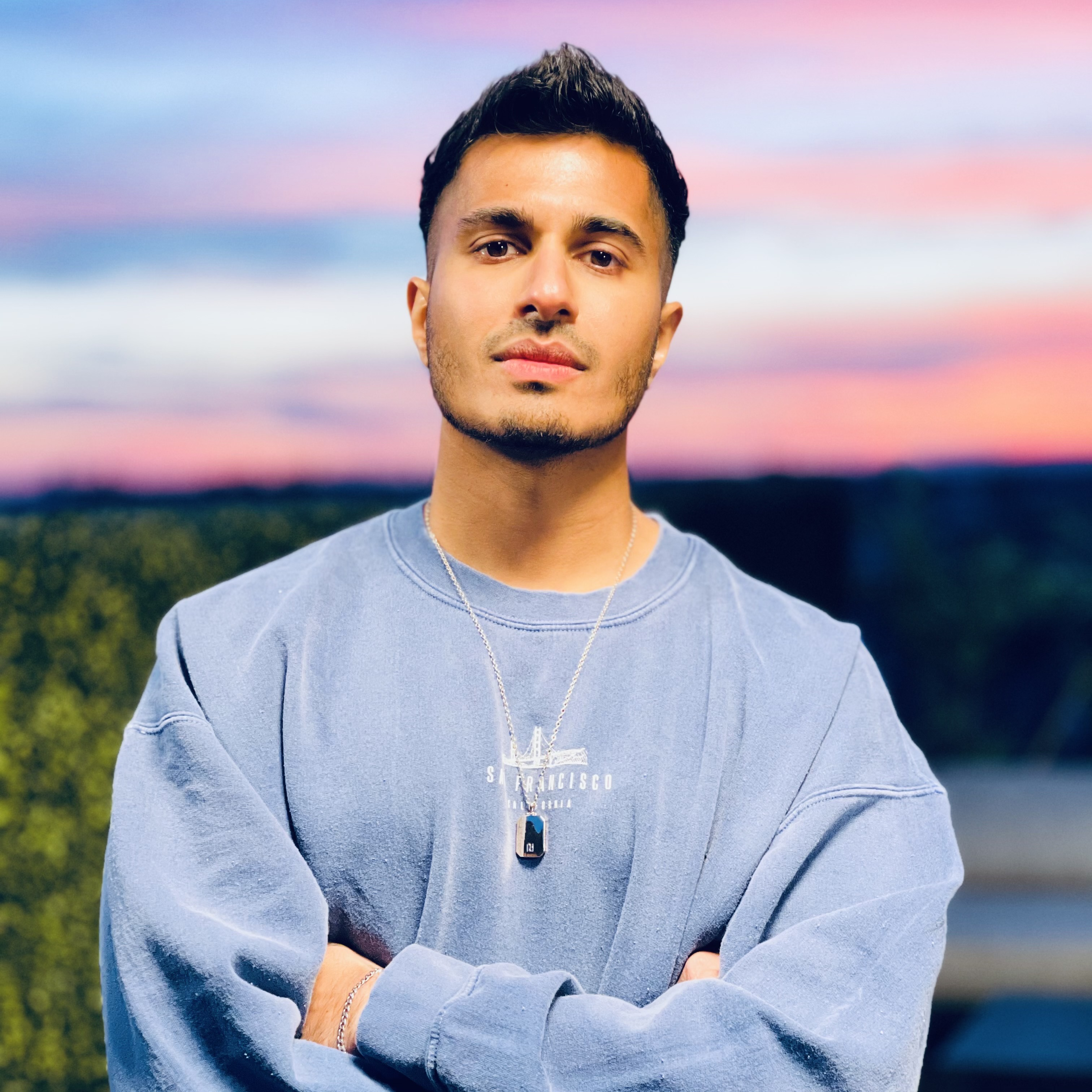
- Arjun in 2021

Background information
- Also known as: Arjun
- Born: Arjun Tariq Kumaraswamy; 23 September 1990 (age 36); Colombo, Sri Lanka
- Genres: R&B, Pop
- Occupations: Singer, Songwriter, Record Producer, Instrumentalist
- Instruments: Vocals, Guitar, Keyboard, Drum, Flute
- Years active: 2010—present
- Labels: T-Series; Universal; Sony Music; Zee Music; Prince Music; VIP
- Spouse: Natasha Sandhu (m. 2018; died 2018)

Arjun Tariq Kumaraswamy is a British Sri Lankan singer. He was born in Colombo, Sri Lanka and raised in London. He sings in English, Tamil, Sinhalese, Hindi, Punjabi, and Spanish.

== Early life ==
Arjun was born in Colombo, Sri Lanka. His father is Tamil and mother is Sinhalese. Arjun's father, Indrajit Coomaraswamy, is a former governor of the Central Bank of Sri Lanka. Arjun was a month old when his family moved to the United Kingdom.

== Career ==
Arjun rose to attention following an R&B cover version of the Tamil song "Why This Kolaveri Di" which was uploaded on YouTube in December 2011. Arjun's R&B Remix ("How could you do this to me?") of "Why This Kolaveri Di" attracted over 3 million YouTube views in one month,

Arjun became known for his fusion of contemporary Western and Eastern sounds, combining R&B with elements of South Asian music. Arjun was nominated for Best Newcomer at the Brit Asia Music Awards in 2011. In December 2011, his song "Stargazer" was voted the number 2 song on the first ever Asian Video Chart on Kiss TV (No.1 was A.R Rahman's group Super Heavy, which included Mick Jagger & Joss Stone.)

In January 2012, Arjun was chosen as one of MTV's "Brand New" (the Top 20 Unsigned Acts) out of thousands of contestants.

Arjun won Best Urban Act at the 2012 UK Asian Music Awards. In 2012, Arjun played the role of Luke Lewis in the online drama Steffi. He was later chosen by Anirudh Ravichander to perform a song in the movie Vanakkam Chennai and subsequently sang and composed other songs for South Indian movies.

In August 2012, Arjun was selected to sing the official theme song for the ICC Cricket World Cup 2011 alongside Bathiya and Santhush. He also produced music for the Sri Lankan Premier League, performing at the opening ceremony of the tournament held at Sugathadasa Stadium in Colombo in August 2012. In October 2012, Arjun won ‘Best Urban Act’ (in association with the MOBOs) at the UK Asian Music Awards 2012. Then, in early 2013, Arjun did a live acoustic session on BBC Radio 1 and was later profiled by DJ's Fearne Cotton and Nihal on Fearne's Radio 1 show. He was voted Eastern Eye Magazine's 'Male Artist of the Year' in 2013.

In July 2014, he performed at Rock Assembly in Wembley Arena, alongside Conor Maynard, Professor Green and Ella Eyre. In July 2014 he also supported musician and singer Anirudh, composer of Why this Kolaveri Di, at Anirudh Live in Singapore. In August 2014, he was a Guest of Honour and sang at the India Day Parade in New York City, the largest annual gathering of Indians in the US.

In September 2014, he performed at Diwali in Time Square, New York, to a crowd of over 200,000. In October 2014, he appeared on the BBC Television programme, Blue Peter. The same year, Arjun signed a record deal with T-Series, India's biggest music label. "I'll Be Waiting", his first single with T-Series album charted at #1 on the iTunes India Chart. Arjun again won Eastern Eye Artist of the Year in 2014. In 2015, he supported Indian singer Arijit Singh at the Hard Rock Café in Dubai.

Arjun was awarded "Musical Artist of the Year" by Anokhi Media in 2016, North America's leading South Asian entertainment and lifestyle media and events company, based in Toronto. In April 2016 he released the song "Suit" with Guru Randhawa which went on to win ‘Club Song of the Year’ at the PTC Awards in 2017 It was also voted ‘Punjabi Song of the Year’ on BBC Asian Network. It was later featured in the Bollywood movie Hindi Medium starring Irrfan Khan (released May 2017).

Arjun signed a record deal with Island Records, a branch of Universal Music, in September 2016 and released his first single with Island in October 2017 and his second single "Vaadi" in February 2018. Arjun released his debut album with Island Records, “Closer to Home” on March 2, 2018; this reached No 1 on the iTunes R&B chart in 24 hours.

In March 2018, he featured in Humza Arshad's parody of the viral Nike advertisement, known as "Nothing Beats A Londoner", featuring notable Londoners from underrepresented minorities such as Juggy D, H-Dhami, Tasha Tah, Sevaqk, Bobby Friction, Raxstar, Tez Ilyas, Mumzy Stranger, Steel Banglez, Char Avell, Jay Sean, Corner Shop Show (Islah Abdur-Rahman, Michael Truong, Can Snatchy Kabadayi) and Naughty Boy. Vidya Vox collaborated with Arjun in 2017 for Joshua Tree for the original song, "Diamonds."

In July 2018, he was one of the headliners at the Croydon London Mela, performing with the London Mozart Players, the longest-established chamber orchestra in the UK. It was the first time the classical orchestra had accompanied an R&B/Hindi fusion artist.

In 2019, Arjun featured in the soundtrack of the Indian film Gully Boy on the song "Goriye", and also collaborated with Dutch artist First Man on the song "Soniyere". In September 2019, Arjun headlined the London Mela, ending by singing Kabhi Jo Baadal as a tribute to his late wife Natasha, during which the audience held up their lit mobile phones as a mark of respect. In October 2019, he was invited by the Federation of Indians in America and the Empire State Realty Trust to switch on the Diwali-themed lights which turned the iconic building orange to mark the city's celebration of the festival of Diwali. 2019 also saw Arjun carry out a 10-city tour of the US, and a 6-city tour of Australia plus Fiji.

He released the video “Tingo” with US desi artist Mickey Singh in September 2019. On 3 December 2019, his late wife Natasha's birthday, he released “One Last Time,” his video tribute to her. He organized a tribute concert to Natasha at London's Apollo Hammersmith theatre in February 2020. Artists Guru Randhawa, Jaz Dhami, Vidya Vox and Mickey Singh flew to London to take part in this concert, attended by over 3,500 people. In 2020, Arjun was named a celebrity ambassador for Cardiac Risk in the Young (C.R.Y) to help spread awareness of young sudden cardiac arrest.

In 2020, he performed at a drive-in concert in London organized by The Bollywood Co, the first Asian/Desi concert of its kind, an adaptation to the restrictions posed due to COVID-19.

Arjun has released collaborative videos with several well-known Desi artists, including Guru Randhawa, Mickey Singh, Vidya Vox, Jonita Gandhi, F1rstman, The PropheC and Falak. In addition to English, he has sung in Hindi, Punjabi, Spanish and Sinhalese.

As of 2021, Arjun has a total of over 1.1 billion views on YouTube.

== Personal life ==
In February 2018, Arjun married Natasha Sandhu, a doctor. On September 20, 2018, Sandhu died due to a cardiac arrest caused by an undiagnosed heart condition. On September 29, 2018, Arjun released a statement regarding the loss of his wife, who was also his publicist and played a significant role in his music career. On 3 December 2019, he released the song "One Last Time" dedicated to her. The music video includes some footage of Sandhu.

In 2020, Arjun was named celebrity ambassador for Cardiac Risk in the Young (C.R.Y) to help spread awareness of young sudden cardiac arrest. As part of his support for the cause, Arjun organized a charity concert in memory of his late wife Natasha called "For Natasha".

== Discography ==
=== Albums ===
- 2018: Closer to Home

=== Songs ===
Year	Track Name	Featuring
2010	"Remember Tonight"	
2011	"Stargazer"	Raxstar
2011	"Vampire"	Starz
2012	"Run Away"(Thuli Thuli Rude Boy Remix)	
2012	"Same Girl"	Guru Randhawa
2013	"Take It Back"	
2014	"I’ll Be Waiting (Kabhi Jo Baadal Barse)"	Arijit Singh
2014	"Excuse Me Girl (Ambarsariyya)"	Reality Raj & Rekha Sawhney
2014	"Mohabbat Barsa De (Sawan Aaya Hai)"	Arijit Singh, Samira Koppikar
2015	"I Know You Want It (Sheila Ki Jawani Remix)"	
2015	"All Of Me (Baarish)"	Tulsi Kumar
2015	"Can't Forget You (Tujhe Bhula Diya)"	Jonita Gandhi
2015	"Frozen"	Sway
2016	"Sanam Ho Ja"	
2017	"Alone"	The PropheC
2018	"Vaadi"	
2018	"S.O.S. "	
2018	"Shoulda Met Me First"	
2019	"Tingo"	Mickey Singh
2019	”One Last Time"	
2020	"Mere Naal Nachna"	
2020	"Kaun Tujhe (Finding The Light)”	Jonita Gandhi
2021	"Baggage"	
2021	"Ding Daga Dong"	Mumzy Stranger
2021	"Screwing It Up"	Amar Sandhu, Raxstar
2023	"Oye Ojaye"	Piyal
2024	"Jane Jana (Give It All Away)	

=== Remixes ===
Year	Track Name	Featuring
2011	"Why This Kolaveri Di" (English R&B Remix)	
2011	"Kabhi Kabhi"	Shivali & Natasha
2012	”Chammak Challo R&B Remix"	
2012	"Zara Zara"	
2012	”Teri Meri"	Priti Menon
2013	”Chaiyya Chaiyya" (Super Bass Remix)	
2013	”Tum Hi Ho" (You Got It Bad Remix)	Rekha Sawhney
2016	"Justin Bieber/Craig David medley” - “Love Yourself /7 Days /Sorry”	
2017	"Nashe si Chadh Gayi/Shape of You” (Remix)	
2017	”Bailando / Zaalima / Despacito" (Spanish Hindi Mashup)	
2017	"Wild Thoughts/Chantaje” (Mashup)	
2018	"Vaadi Remix"	
2020	"Shayad (English Remix)"	
2020	”Tujhe Kitna Chahne Lage" (English Remix)	
2020	”Chahun Main Ya Naa" (English Remix)	
2021	"Hold On/Pal Pal Dil ke Paas” (Mashup)	
2021	"Manike Mage Hithe" (English Remix)	
2021	"Raataan Lambiyan" (English Remix)	

=== Soundtracks ===
Year	Film	Track Name
2013	Vanakkam Chennai	"Oh Penne – International Version"
2013	Biriyani	"Bay of Bengal"
2014	"Vaaliba Raja"	"Ice Cream Penne"
2014	"Creature 3D"	"Mohabbat Barsa De"
2017	"Hindi Medium"	"Suit Suit"
2019	"Gully Boy"	"Goriye"
