= The Ultimate Fling =

Single by Poets of the Fall

from the album Revolution Roulette
- Released: 6 February 2008 (Finland)
- Genre: Post-grunge
- Length: 21:23
- Label: Insomniac
- Songwriters: Markus Kaarlonen, Marko Saaresto and Olli Tukiainen.

Poets of the Fall singles chronology
"Locking Up the Sun" (2006)	"The Ultimate Fling" (2008)	"Diamonds for Tears" (2008)

The Ultimate Fling is the first single from the album Revolution Roulette by the Finnish rock band Poets of the Fall. It was released in Finland on 6 February 2008. The single features three versions of the title track as well as a live recording of "Fire", the opening track from the band's second album Carnival of Rust. The live version was recorded during the Poets' performance at the Ankkarock Festival 2007 on 5 August 2007. The single peaked at number two in the official Finnish charts.

== Track listing ==
1. The Ultimate Fling (producer's cut) (4:23)
2. The Ultimate Fling (director's cut) (7:01)
3. The Ultimate Fling (The Impromptu Alternate Version) (4:43)
4. Fire (Live from Ankkarock 2007) (5:16)

== Charts ==
Chart (2008)	Peak position
Finnish Singles Chart	2
