= Jonita Gandhi =

Canadian singer (born 1989)

Jonita
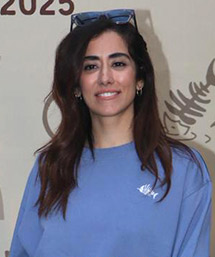
- Gandhi in 2025
- Born: Jonita Gandhi; 23 October 1989 (age 37); New Delhi, India
- Citizenship: Canada
- Occupations: Singer; Playback singer; Actress
- Musical career
- Origin: Ontario, Canada
- Genres: Classical; Western; pop; jazz; playback
- Instruments: Vocals; keyboard
- Years active: 2013–present
- Label: 91 North Records
- Website: jonitagandhi.com

Jonita Gandhi (born 23 October 1989), credited mononymously as Jonita, is a Canadian singer known for her work in the Indian film and music industries. Since 2024, she has performed as a solo pop artist by releasing her debut independent EP Love Like That.

She has recorded songs predominantly in Hindi, Urdu, Tamil, Telugu languages with few in Punjabi, Marathi, Gujarati, Bengali. Some of her most acclaimed songs include "The Breakup Song", "Mental Manadhil". She is also well known for her YouTube presence. Her singing debut started through Chennai Express in 2013.

== Personal life ==
Gandhi was born in a Punjabi family from Delhi. Her family emigrated to Brampton, Canada when she was nine months old, where she was raised; she attended Turner Fenton Secondary School. Her family later settled in Mississauga.

Gandhi attended the Ivey Business School of the University of Western Ontario where she completed her degrees in health science and business in 2012. She has had formal training in Western and Hindustani classical singing.

== Career ==
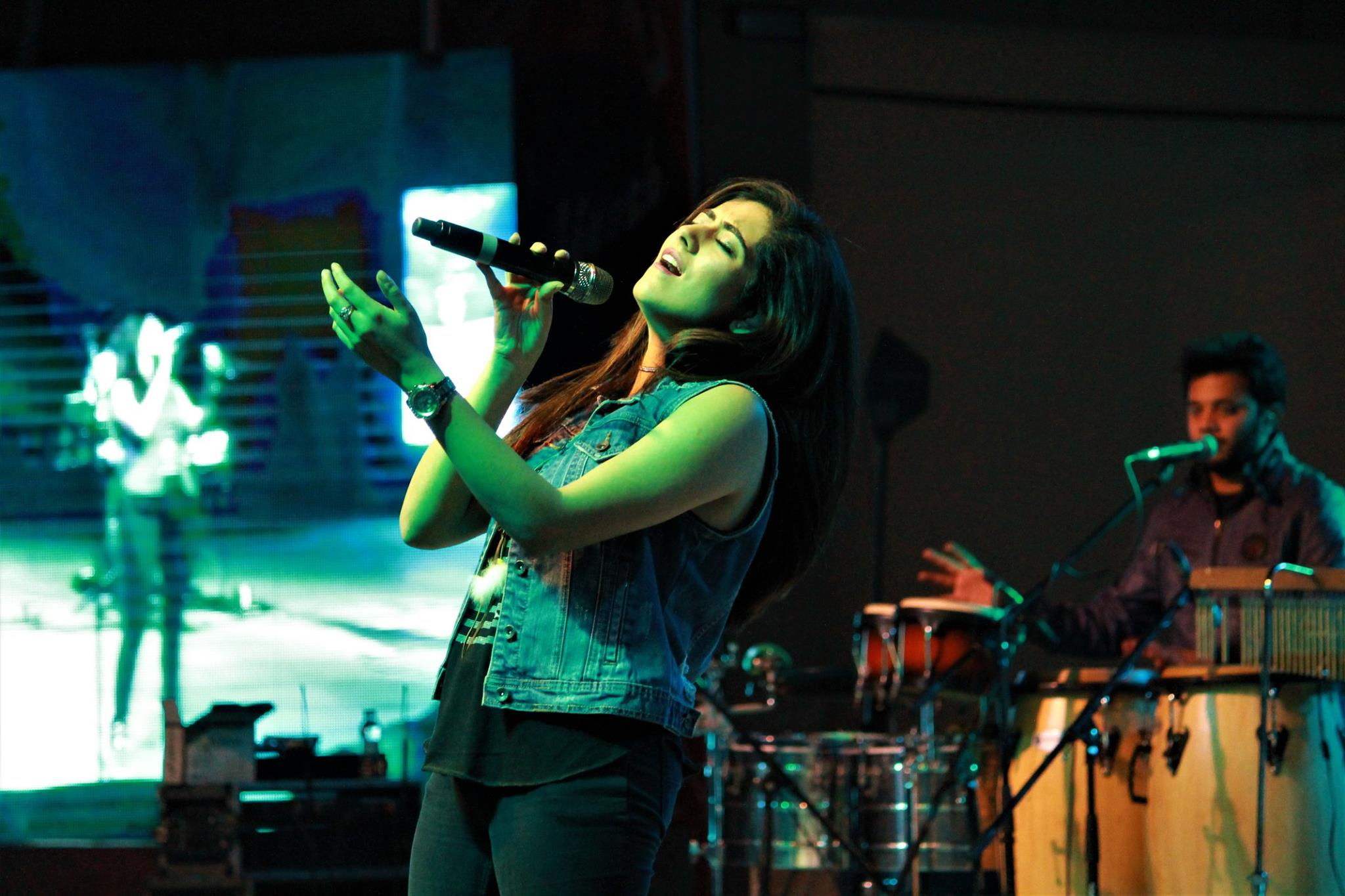
Gandhi performs at Aurora, Atal Bihari Vajpayee Indian Institute of Information Technology and Management, Gwalior

Gandhi grew up around music as both her father and brother were part time musicians. They would often perform cover songs together at live community events. At age 16, she auditioned for Canadian Idol but did not get past the audition rounds. She began making YouTube covers from her bedroom, sometimes featuring other local musicians including Akash Gandhi. The videos quickly went viral and contained notable covers of popular Hindi-film songs, including "Pani Da Rang", "Tujhko Jo Paaya", "Tum Hi Ho", "Suhaani Raat", "Yeh Honsla".

Gandhi's career in playback singing began with an opportunity to perform alongside Sonu Nigam on a tour. This tour crossed various countries including Russia, UK, US and the Caribbean. Gandhi started playback singing with Chennai Express. The music for this film was composed by Vishal–Shekhar. She further worked on the soundtrack of other Bollywood movies like Highway, singing both "Kahaan Hoon Main" and "Implosive Silence".

Gandhi worked as a playback singer with music directors including A. R. Rahman and Pritam. Rahman featured Gandhi in the concert film One Heart. Gandhi performed at the 2016 Jubilee Games in Dubai with Salim–Sulaiman and with Amit Trivedi on MTV Unplugged.

In 2020, Jonita Gandhi was involved in mentoring and judging the Indian kids singing reality show Taare Zameen Par on StarPlus.

As of 2026, Gandhi is set to make her film debut with director Vignesh Shivan's Tamil film Walking/Talking Strawberry Icecream, starring Krishnakumar Balasubramanian.

As a part of IPL 2023 Closing ceremony, Jonita gave her musical performance along with DIVINE at Narendra Modi Stadium in Ahmedabad.

In 2025, Jonita was featured on English singer-songwriter Ed Sheeran's remix EP, Play – The Remixes, on the track "Heaven".

== Discography ==
=== Extended Plays (EP) ===
Year	Song	Album	Language	Composer	Notes	Ref
2024	"Love Like That (feat. Ali Sethi)"	Love Like That - EP	Punjabi, English	Jonita, Ali Sethi, Juan Ariza, Julia Gartha	Debut EP	
2024	"Always & Forever (Naal Ve)"	Love Like That - EP	Punjabi, English	Jonita, Juan Ariza, Rachel West, Fuad, Deputy	Debut EP	
2024	"Tu Jaane"	Love Like That - EP	Hindi, English	Jonita, Juan Ariza, Julia Gartha	Debut EP	
2024	"It Is What It Is (Madhaniya)"	Love Like That - EP	Punjabi, English	Jonita, Juan Ariza, Julia Gartha, Deputy	Debut EP	

=== Singles ===
==== As lead artist ====
List of singles, with year released, selected chart positions, and album name shown
Title	Year	Peak chart positions			Album
Title	Year	LAT Air.	LTU Air.	ROU Air.	Album
"Hello" (with Leigh-Anne and Sigala)	2025	13	47	71	TBA
"Last Night on Earth" (with Cheat Codes)	2026	9	—	—	Non-album single
"—" denotes a recording that did not chart in that territory.

==== As featured artist ====
Title	Year	Peak chart positions	Album
"Heaven" (Ed Sheeran featuring Jonita)	2025	—	Play – The Remixes
"—" denotes releases that did not chart or were not released in that region.

=== Film Songs ===
==== Hindi ====
Year	Movie	Song	Music	Lyrics	Co-singer(s)	Note
2013	Chennai Express	"Chennai Express"	Vishal–Shekhar	Amitabh Bhattacharya	S. P. Balasubrahmanyam	
2014	Highway	"Implosive Silence"	A. R. Rahman	Irshad Kamil		
2014	Highway	"Kahaan Hoon Main"	A. R. Rahman	Irshad Kamil		
2014	Kochadaiiyaan (D)	"Dil Chaspiya"	A. R. Rahman	Irshad Kamil	Arijit Singh	Hindi Dub
2014	Lekar Hum Deewana Dil	"Maaloom"	A. R. Rahman	Amitabh Bhattacharya	Hriday Gattani, Nakash Aziz	
2014	Lekar Hum Deewana Dil	"Tasalli"	A. R. Rahman	Amitabh Bhattacharya		Bonus Track
2014	Gang of Ghosts	"Rimco - Machis Ki Tilli"	Dharam Sandeep	Rashmi Singh	Malini Banerjee, Ashwarya Nigam, Sandeep Patil (Rap)	
2015	Main Aur Charles	"Woh Tho Yahin Hai Lekin"	Vipin Patwa	Dr. Sagar		
2016	Dishoom	"Sau Tarah Ke"	Pritam	Kumaar, Ashish Pandit	Amit Mishra	
2016	Pink	"Pink Anthem"	Anupam Roy	Irshad Kamil	EPR Iyer	
2016	Ae Dil Hai Mushkil	"The Breakup Song"	Pritam	Amitabh Bhattacharya	Arijit Singh, Badshah, Nakash Aziz	Nominated, Most Entertaining Singer (Female) at Big ZEE Entertainment Awards Nominated, Zee Cine Award for Best Playback Singer – Female Nominated, Filmfare Award for Best Female Playback Singer Nominated, Best Playback – Female at Stardust Awards
2017	Dangal	"Gilehriyaan"	Pritam	Amitabh Bhattacharya	Neha Kakkar	Winner, Critics' Choice Female Vocalist of The Year at Mirchi Music Awards
2017	Shorgul	"Tere Bina"	Niladri Kumar	Kapil Sibal	Arijit Singh, Awaaz Children's Choir	
2017	Ok Jaanu	"Saajan Aayo Re"	A. R. Rahman	Gulzar	Nakash Aziz	
2017	Meri Pyaari Bindu	"Ye Jawaani Teri"	Sachin–Jigar	Kausar Munir	Nakash Aziz	
2017	Dear Maya	"Kehne Ko"	Anupam Roy	Irshad Kamil		
2017	Mom	"Raakh Baakhi"	A. R. Rahman	Irshad Kamil, Rianjali	Rianjali	
2017	A Gentleman	"Chandralekha"	Sachin–Jigar	Vayu	Vishal Dadlani	
2017	Jab Harry Met Sejal	"Yaadon Mein"	Pritam	Irshad Kamil	Mohammed Irfan, Cuca Roseta, Arjun Chandy	
2017	Simran	"Lagdi Hai Thaai"	Sachin–Jigar	Vayu	Guru Randhawa	
2017	Bhoomi	"Will You Marry Me"	Sachin–Jigar	Anvita Dutt	Divya Kumar	
2018	Pad Man	"Sayaani"	Amit Trivedi	Kausar Munir	Amit Trivedi, Yashita Sharma, Yashika Sikka, Rani Kaur	
2018	3 Storeys	"Bas Tu Hai"	Clinton Cerejo	Puneet Krishna	Arijit Singh	
2018	Phamous	"Dil Beparwah"	Sundeep Gosswami, Surya Vishwakarma	Naveen Tyagi	Jubin Nautiyal	
2018	When Obama Loved Osama	"Nasha Tera"	Rishabh Sambhav Jain		Sambhav Jain	
2018	Saheb, Biwi Aur Gangster 3	"Lag Ja Gale"	Madan Mohan (recreated by Rana Mazumder)	Raja Mehdi Ali Khan		
2018	Race 3	"Allah Duhai Hai"	Pritam (recreated by JAM8)	Shabbir Ahmed, Shloke Lal, Raja Kumari (rap lyrics)	Amit Mishra, Sreerama Chandra, Raja Kumari (Rap)	
2018	Laila Majnu	"Aahista"	Niladri Kumar	Irshad Kamil	Arijit Singh	
2018	Manmarziyaan	"Sacchi Mohabbat"	Amit Trivedi	Shellee	Shahid Mallya	
2019	End Counter	"Main To Jee Rahi"	Rahul Jain			
2019	SP Chauhan	"Jhumka Bareli Wala"	Vibhas	Dr. Devindra Kafir	Dev Negi, Harshdeep Kaur, Navraj Hans, Wasim	
2019	SP Chauhan	"Sadke Jawaan (Reprise)"	Vibhas	Dr. Devindra Kafir	Sonu Nigam	
2019	Total Dhamaal	"Speaker Phat Jaaye"	Gourov-Roshin	Kumaar	Harrdy Sandhu, Abuzar Akhtar, Aditi Singh Sharma	
2019	Kalank	"Rajvaadi Odhni"	Pritam	Amitabh Bhattacharya		
2019	The Extraordinary Journey of the Fakir	"Angrezi Luv Shuv"	Amit Trivedi	Anvita Dutt	Amit Trivedi	English film
2019	Dream Girl	"Dil Ka Telephone"	Meet Bros	Kumaar	Nakash Aziz	
2019	The Sky Is Pink	"Pink Gulaabi Sky"	Pritam	Gulzar	Shashwat Singh	
2019	Made In China	"The Naari Naari Song"	Sachin–Jigar	Vayu	Vishal Dadlani, Sachin–Jigar	
2020	Bhangra Paa Le	"Peg Sheg"	A Bazz, Nilotpal Munshi (Jam8)	Shloke Lal, A Bazz	Akasa Singh, Shashwat Singh, A Bazz	
2020	Bhangra Paa Le	"Sun Sajna"	Rishi Rich, Kiranee, Yash Narvekar	Shloke Lal, Kiranee	Navraj Hans, Yash Narvekar, Kiranee	
2020	Baaghi 3	"Bhankas"	Tanishk Bagchi, Bappi Lahiri	Shabbir Ahmed	Bappi Lahiri, Dev Negi	
2020	Maska	"Chuney Chuney"	Mikey McCleary, Ketan Sodha	Herself		
2020	Dil Bechara	"Main Tumhara"	A. R. Rahman	Amitabh Bhattacharya	Hriday Gattani	Winner, Best Original Song at FOI Online Awards
2020	Waah Zindagi	"Naino"	Parag Chhabra	Shellee	Devender Pal Singh, Parag Chhabra	
2020	Indoo Ki Jawani	"Single Ladies "	Rochak Kohli	Gurpreet Saini, Gautam G Sharma	Rochak Kohli, Sukhe	
2021	The Girl on the Train	"Mahi Mera Ranjha"	Sunny and Inder Bawra	Kumaar	Navraj Hans	
2021	Time to Dance	"Baby! Tu Na Jaa"	Gurinder Seagal	Kunaal Vermaa	Gurinder Seagal	
2021	My Indian Boyfriend	"Wo Deewana Ladka"	Shravan Bharadwaj			
2022	Raw (D)	"Halamathi Habibo"	Anirudh Ravichander	Raqueeb Alam	Anirudh Ravichander	Hindi version of Beast soundtrack
2022	Pyar Mein Thoda Twist	"Tutak Tutak Tutiya"	Bappi Lahiri	Minoo Singh		
2022	Jayeshbhai Jordaar	"Nanki’s Theme"	Sanchit Balhara and Ankit Balhara	N/A		
2022	Brahmāstra	"Deva Deva"	Pritam	Amitabh Bhattacharya	Arijit Singh	Nominated, Best Playback Singer - Female at IIFA 2023 Nominated, Best Playback Singer (Female) at Filmfare Awards 2023
2022	Brahmāstra	"Deva Deva (Film Version)"	Pritam	Amitabh Bhattacharya	Arijit Singh	Nominated, Best Playback Singer - Female at IIFA 2023 Nominated, Best Playback Singer (Female) at Filmfare Awards 2023
2022	Cirkus	"Current Laga Re"	Lijo George–DJ Chetas	Kumaar	Nakash Aziz, Dhvani Bhanushali, Lijo George, Vivek Hariharan	
2022	99 songs	"Drugs (Background Score)"	A.R. Rahman	N/A		Background Score only
2022	Thai Massage	"Kyon"	Joi Barua	Irshad Kamil	Amit Mishra	
2023	Ponniyin Selvan: II (D)	"Megha Re Megha"	A. R. Rahman	Gulzar	Antara Nandy	Hindi Dubbed
2023	Jogira Sara Ra Ra	"Torture"	Meet Bros	Kumaar	Meet Bros	
2023	8 A.M. Metro	"Hey Fikar"	Mark K Robin	Kausar Munir		
2023	Rocky Aur Rani Kii Prem Kahaani	"What Jhumka?"	Pritam, Madan Mohan	Amitabh Bhattacharya	Arijit Singh, Ranveer Singh	
2023	Rocky Aur Rani Kii Prem Kahaani	"Saregama Caravan Medley"	Pritam	Amitabh Bhattacharya	Shashwat Singh	
2023	Dream Girl 2	"Dil Ka Telephone 2.0"	Meet Bros	Kumaar	Jubin Nautiyal, Meet Bros	
2023	Dream Girl 2	"Jamnapar"	Meet Bros	Kumaar, Herself	Meet Bros, Neha Kakkar, Maanuni Desai, Samaaira Chandhoke	
2023	Jawan	"Faraatta"	Anirudh Ravichander	Kumaar	Arijit Singh, Badshah	
2023	Aankh Micholi	"Ve Dholna"	Sachin-Jigar	Priya Saraiya	Shashwat Singh	
2024	Fighter	"Dil Banaane Waaleya"	Vishal–Shekhar	Kumaar	Arijit Singh	
2024	Woh Bhi Din The	"Higher"	Joi Barua	Irshad Kamil		
2024	Amar Singh Chamkila	"Vida Karo"	A. R. Rahman	Irshad Kamil	Arijit Singh	
2024	Ishq Vishk Rebound	"Soni Soni"	Rochak Kohli	Gurpreet Saini	Darshan Raval	
2025	Dhadak 2	"Preet Re"	Rochak Kohli	Gurpreet Saini	Darshan Raval	
2025	Nadaaniyan	"Nadaaniyan- Title Track"	Sachin-Jigar	Amitabh Bhattacharya	Varun Jain, Neuman Pinto	
2025	Chhaava	"Teri Chaahat"	A.R. Rahman	Irshad Kamil	Seeta Qasemi	
2025	Tere Ishk Mein	"Usey Kehna"	A.R. Rahman	Irshad Kamil	Nitesh Aher	
2026	Hai Jawani Toh Ishq Hona Hai	"Tera Ho Jaun"	White Noise Collectives	Vayu Shrivastav	Stebin Ben	
2026	Hai Jawani Toh Ishq Hona Hai	"Chunnari Chunnari - Let's Go!"	Akshay–IP, Anu Malik	Sameer Anjaan, IP Singh	IP Singh, Asees Kaur, Sudhir Yaduvanshi, Anuradha Sriram	

==== Tamil ====
Year	Film	Song	Music	Lyrics	Co-singer(s)
2015	O Kadhal Kanmani	"Mental Manadhil"	A. R. Rahman	A. R. Rahman, Mani Ratnam	A. R. Rahman, Aalap Raju
2015	O Kadhal Kanmani	"Mental Manadhil" (Female)	A. R. Rahman	A. R. Rahman, Mani Ratnam	
2016	24	"Mei Nigara"	A. R. Rahman	Madhan Karky	Sid Sriram, Sanah Moidutty
2016	Achcham Yenbadhu Madamaiyada	"Idhu Naal"	A. R. Rahman	Madhan Karky	Aditya Rao
2017	Enakku Vaaitha Adimaigal	"Kannadi Poovukku"	Santhosh Dayanidhi	Kabilan	Haricharan
2017	Kaatru Veliyidai	"Azhagiye"	A. R. Rahman	Madhan Karky, Navneet Virk (Punjabi lyrics)	Arjun Chandy, Haricharan
2017	Velaikkaran	"Iraiva"	Anirudh Ravichander	Viveka	Anirudh Ravichander
2018	Irumbu Thirai	"Azhagae"	Yuvan Shankar Raja	Vivek	Arun Kamath
2018	Kolamavu Kokila	"Orey Oru"	Anirudh Ravichander	Vignesh Shivan	Anirudh Ravichander
2018	Sarkar	"OMG Ponnu"	A. R. Rahman	Vivek	Sid Sriram
2018	Kaatrin Mozhi	"Rekkai Thulirtha"	A.H. Kaashif	Madhan Karky	
2019	Pakkiri (Tamil version)	"Engleesu Lovesu"	Amit Trivedi	Madhan Karky	Dhanush
2019	Thumbaa	"Jilebara"	Vivek–Mervin	Ku. Karthik	Vivek–Mervin
2019	Kaappaan	"Hey Amigo"	Harris Jayaraj	Vairamuthu	Leslee Lewis
2019	Sanga Thamizhan	"Sandakari Neethan"	Vivek–Mervin	Prakash Francis	Anirudh Ravichander, Mervin Solomon
2019	Action	"Nee Sirichalum"	Hiphop Tamizha	Pa. Vijay	Sadhana Sargam, Srinisha Jayaseelan
2020	Teddy	"Marandhaye"	D. Imman	Madhan Karky	Pradeep Kumar
2020	Kaatteri	"En Peru Enna Kelu"	S. N. Prasad	Srikanth Varadan	Maria Roe Vincent
2020	Doctor	"Chellama"	Anirudh Ravichandar	Sivakarthikeyan	Anirudh Ravichander
2021	Mudhal Nee Mudivum Nee	"Pudhidhaai"	Darbuka Siva	Keerthi	
2021	Sinam	"Enil Paaindhidum"	Shabir	Karky	Shabir
2021	99 Songs (Tamil)	"Seemanthapoo"	A. R. Rahman	Kutti Revathi	Sharanya Srinivas, Sireesha Bhagavatula
2021	Annabelle Sethupathi	"Ghost Party"	Krishna Kishor	Ku. Karthik	Aaryan Dinesh Kanagaratnam, Yashita Sharma
2021	Border	"Nenjae Nenjae"	Sam C. S.	Viveka	Karthik
2022	Beast	"Arabic Kuthu"	Anirudh Ravichander	Sivakarthikeyan	Anirudh Ravichander
2022	No Entry	"Oh Reba"	Ajesh	Ku. Karthik	Benny Dayal
2022	Don	"Private Party"	Anirudh Ravichander	Sivakarthikeyan	Anirudh Ravichander
2022	The Legend	"Vaadi Vaasal"	Harris Jayaraj	Snehan	Benny Dayal
2022	The Legend	"Popopo"	Harris Jayaraj	Madhan Karky	KK, Prasad SN
2022	Brahmāstra (Tamil version)	"Deva Deva (Tamil)"	Pritam	Madhan Karky	Sid Sriram
2022	Parole	"Anbe Gadhi"	Rajkumar Amal	Dwarakh Raja	
2023	Varisu	"Jimikki Ponnu"	Thaman S	Vivek	Anirudh Ravichander
2023	Jawan (Tamil version)	"Pattasa"	Anirudh Ravichander	Vivek, Arivu	Nakash Aziz, Arivu
2023	Kick	"Gilma"	Arjun Janya	Viveka	
2024	Merry Christmas	"Neela Ravile"	Pritam	Yugabharathi	
2024	Inga Naan Thaan Kingu	"Maayoney"	D. Imman	Muthamil	Sean Roldan
2024	Eleven	"Azhagaana Arakkana"	D. Imman	Vishnu Edavan	
2025	Nilavuku En Mel Ennadi Kobam	"Yedi"	G. V. Prakash Kumar	Vivek	Dhanush
2025	Dude	"Kannukulla"	Sai Abhyankkar	Adesh Krishna	Sai Abhyankkar, Arjun

==== Telugu ====
Year	Film	Song	Music	Lyrics	Co-singer(s)	Note
2015	Kick 2	"Nuvve Nuvve"	S. Thaman	Varikuppala Yadagiri	Thaman S	
2015	Kick 2	"Janda Pai Kapiraju"	S. Thaman		Divya Kumar	
2015	Kerintha	"Ye Kadhaa"	Mickey J. Meyer	Ramajogayya Sastry		
2015	OK Bangaram	"Mental Madhilo"	A. R. Rahman	Sirivennela Seetharama Sastry	Krishna Chaitanya	
2016	24 (Telugu version)	"Manasuke"	A. R. Rahman	Chandrabose	Sid Sriram, Sanah Moidutty	
2016	24 (Telugu version)	"Deivam Raasina Kavitha"	A. R. Rahman	Chandrabose	Haricharan	
2017	Cheliyaa	"Hamsaro"	A. R. Rahman	Sirivennela Seetharama Sastry, Navneet Virk (Punjabi lyrics)	Arjun Chandy, Haricharan	
2017	Kaadhali	"Ela Thelchaali"	Prasan Praveen Shyam	Vanamali		
2018	Hello	"Yevevo"	Anup Rubens	Chandrabose	Akhil Akkineni	
2018	Anaganaga O Premakatha	"Ninne Vidavanule"	KC Anjan	Shreemani		
2018	Sarkar (Telugu version)	"OMG Pilla"	A. R. Rahman	Vanamali	Sid Sriram	
2018	Next Enti?	"Love'Otsavam"	Leon James	Ramajogayya Sastry	Benny Dayal	
2018	Lover	"Anthe Kadha Mari"	Ankit Tiwari	Sirivennela Seetharama Sastry	Ankit Tiwari	
2019	Bandobast	"Hey Amigo"	Harris Jayaraj	Vanamali	Leslee Lewis, Haricharan	
2021	Love Story	"Evo Evo Kalale"	Pawan Ch	Bhaskarabhatla Ravi Kumar	Nakul Abhyankar	
2021	Varun Doctor (Telugu version)	"Chittemma"	Anirudh Ravichander	Srinivasa Moorthy	Anirudh Ravichander	
2022	Beast (Telugu version)	"Halamathi Habibo"	Anirudh Ravichander	Sri Sai Kiran	Anirudh Ravichander	
2022	Sarkaru Vaari Paata	"Ma Ma Mahesha"	S. Thaman	Anantha Sriram	Sri Krishna	Nominated–SIIMA Award for Best Female Playback Singer – Telugu
2022	Thank You	"Ento Enteynto"	S. Thaman	Anantha Sriram		
2022	Brahmāstra (Telugu version)	"Deva Deva (Telugu)"	Pritam	Chandrabose	Sreerama Chandra	
2023	Rangabali	"Raya Raya Ro"	Pawan CH	Anantha Sriram	Hiral Viradia	
2023	Jawan (Telugu version)	"Galatta"	Anirudh Ravichander	Chandrabose	Nakash Aziz, Arivu	
2023	Jorugaa Husharugaa	"Kanulu Kalalu Vera"	Praneet Muzic	Purnachary		
2024	Merry Christmas (Telugu version)	"Vedi Chenthane"	Pritam	Chandrabose		
2025	Dude (Telugu version)	"Nee Gunde Lona"	Sai Abhyankkar	Ramajogayya Sastry	Sai Abhyankkar, Arjun	

==== Kannada ====
Year	Film	Song	Music	Lyrics	Co-singer(s)	Note
2016	Niruttara	"Neenene Hosa Kanasu"	Niladri Kumar	Kaviraj		
2016	Niruttara	"Aalangisu Baa Nannanu"	Niladri Kumar	Kaviraj	Balachandra Prabhu	
2020	Butterfly	"Manasu Eegaaitu"	Amit Trivedi	Jayanth Kaikini	Nikhita Gandhi	
2021	99 Songs	"Sai Shirdi Sai"	A. R. Rahman	Vasuki Vaibhav		Music Video
2022	Beast (Kannada version)	"Halamathi Habibo"	Anirudh Ravichander	Varadaraj Chikkaballapura	Dinker Kalvala	
2022	Brahmāstra (Kannada version)	"Deva Deva (Kannada)"	Pritam	Hridaya Shiva	Sanjith Hegde	

==== Bengali ====
Year	Film	Song	Music	Lyrics	Co-singer(s)	Note
2013	Majnu	"E Mon Aajkal"	Rishi Chanda	Prasen	Rishi Chanda	
2014	Bangali Babu English Mem	"Eai Ki Prem"	Rishi Chanda	Prasen	Rishi Chanda	
2017	Ami Je Ke Tomar	"Bhalobeshe Felechi"	Indradeep Dasgupta	Prasen	Ash King	
2017	Boss 2: Back to Rule	"Yaara Meherbaan"	Jeet Gannguli	Pranjal	Nakash Aziz	

==== Malayalam ====
Year	Film	Song	Music	Lyrics	Co-singer(s)	Note
2019	Pathinettam Padi	"Kaattalakal"	A.H. Kaashif	Vinayak		
2022	Beast (Malayalam version)	"Halamathi Habibo"	Anirudh Ravichander	Deepak Ram	Dinker Kalvala	
2023	Thrishanku	"Dapper Maama"	Jay Unnithan	Manu Manjith		

==== Gujarati ====
Year	Film	Song	Music	Lyrics	Co-singer(s)	Note
2018	Love Ni Bhavai	"I Love You, Re Mari Savaar"	Sachin–Jigar	Niren Bhatt		
2018	Mijaaj	"Bhinjaaun"	Meghdhanush	Priya Saraiya		
2018	Oxygen	"Nokho Anokho"	Parth Bharat Thakkar	Chinmaay Purohit	Parthiv Gohil	

==== Marathi ====
Year	Film	Song	Music	Lyrics	Co-singer(s)	Note(s)
2017	FU: Friendship Unlimited	"Affoo Khudaya"	Samir Saptiskar, Vishal Mishra (original by Kalyanji–Anandji)	Anand Bakshi, Raj Shekhar	Sonu Nigam, Earl Edgar	
2017	Dry Day	"Ashi Kashi"	Ashwin Srinivasan	Jai Atre	Ash King	
2024	Yek Number	"Majha Yek Number Title Song"	Ajay-Atul		100RBH	

==== Punjabi ====
Year	Film	Song	Music	Lyrics	Co-singer(s)	Note
2017	Jindua	"Takdi Ravan"	Arjuna Harjai	Kumaar	Akhil	
2017	Mahi NRI	"One More Thumka"	Arjuna Harjai	Kumaar	Anubhav Singh, Arjuna Harjai	

==== Urdu ====
Year	Film	Song	Music	Lyrics	Co-singer(s)	Notes
2017	Punjab Nahi Jaungi	"Ae Dil"	Shiraz Uppal	Shakeel Sohail	Shiraz Uppal	Pakistani Film
2017	Rangreza	"Bagiya Mein"	Qurram Hussain	Tauqeer Bhinder		Pakistani film; Nominated, Best Singer (Female) at Lux Style Awards
2022	Tich Button	"Ehsaan Hai Tumhara"	Adrian David Emmanuel	Shakeel Sohail	Farhan Saeed	Pakistani film
2023	Babylicious	"Gazab Kurriye"	Adrian David Emmanuel	Shakeel Sohail	Ahmed Jahanzeb	Pakistani film

==== English ====
Year	Film	Song	Music	Lyrics	Co-singer(s)	Notes
2016	Pelé: Birth of a Legend	"Blessings from the Sky"	A. R. Rahman			

=== Non-film songs ===
Year	Song	Album	Language	Composer	Note	Ref.
2013	"Pinjra"	MTV Coke Studio India (Season 3)	Hindi	Clinton Cerejo	With Sanam Puri	
2014	"Simply Sufi"	Single	Hindi	Salim–Sulaiman	Simply Sufi TVC ad	
2014	"Aa Bhi Jaa"	Raunaq	Hindi	A. R. Rahman		
2014	"Geet Gaaon"	Raunaq	Hindi	A. R. Rahman		
2015	"Can't Forget You (Tujhe Bula Diya)"	Single	Hindi, English	Arjun	Music Video	
2016	"First Date"	First Date: Musical Short Film	Hindi	Vinay Jaiswal		
2016	"Deewaren: Unity Song for Holi"	First Date: Musical Short Film	Hindi	Vinay Jaiswal		
2016	"Tu Hai"	Single	Hindi	Salim–Sulaiman	Jammin'	
2016	"Yaara"	Single	Hindi	A. R. Rahman	Jammin'	
2016	"Meetha Zeher"	Playing Priya: Short Film	Hindi	Joi Barua		
2016	"Away & Beyond"	Single	English	Arjuna Harjai	Maruti Ciaz	
2016	"Satellite"	Dance Under the Influence	English	Sanjoy	Music Album	
2017	"Udd Chal"	Single	Hindi	Srihari Jagannathan	Chennai Street Band	
2017	"Zikr (Celebrating Eid)"	Single	Hindi	Salim–Sulaiman		
2017	"Raat Abhi Baaki Hai"	Single	Hindi	Shayadshah Shahebdin	Times Music	
2017	"Lafz Unkahe"	Lafz Unkahe	Hindi	Ajay Singha	Music Album	
2018	"Andekha, Ansuna, Anchua"	Single	Hindi	Vishal Bhardwaj	Zee Brand Anthem	
2018	"Aayat Bane Hum"	Single	Hindi	Mickey J. Meyer	T-Series Pop Chartbusters	
2018	"Castles"	Future Perfect	English	Anish Sood	Music Album	
2018	"Lamhein Beetey Hue"	Single	Hindi	Anurag Godbole		
2018	"Kaadhal"	Single	Tamil	A.H.Kaashif		
2018	"Haq Hai"	Budh: Short Film	Hindi	Shreyas Puranik	Times Music	
2018	"Raahat"	Single	Hindi	Ashish-Vijay	T-Series Pop Chartbusters	
2018	"Padharo Mawla"	Single	Hindi	Salim–Sulaiman		
2018	"Jeeya Mar Ke (Tum Mile Dil Khile)"	Single	Hindi	Parichay	Saregama Music	
2018	"Kanne Kanne"	Single	Tamil	Leon James	7UP Madras Gig	
2018	"Taajub Hai"	Single	Hindi	Gulraj Singh	OnePlus Playback	
2018	"Sar Utha Ke Jiyo"	Single	Hindi	Arjun Kanungo	HDFC Life	
2018	"Jheeni Jheeni"	Single	Hindi	Salim–Sulaiman	Music Album	
2018	"Nis Din Nis Din"	Single	Hindi	A. R. Rahman	Jammin'	
2018	"Eh le Himmat"	Single	Hindi	Ranjit Barot	Jammin'	
2019	"Ganga: The River of People"	Single	Hindi	Prakash	Apollo Tyres	
2019	"Haaye Oye (Acoustic)"	Single	Hindi	QARAN		
2019	"Nach Baliye"	Single	Hindi	Lijo George -Dj Chetas	Nach Baliye season nine theme song	
2019	"Ab Aaja"	Flip	Hindi	Gajendra Verma	Music Album	
2019	"Humraahi"	Single	Hindi	Arjuna Harjai	OnePlus Playback	
2019	"Priyasakhi"	Single	Tamil	Arjuna Harjai	OnePlus Playback	
2019	"Tere Bina" (Acoustic)	Single	Hindi	Zaeden		
2019	"Bachpan Ki Dhun"	Single	Hindi	Ankur Tewari	CRY – Child Rights and You	
2020	"Dil Kho Ke"	Single	Hindi	Arjun Kanungo		
2020	"Roiyaan Ve"	Single	Hindi	Arjuna Harjai		
2020	"Hum Haar Nahin Maanenge"	Single	Hindi	A. R. Rahman		
2020	"Dusk Stories"	Single	Hindi	Sanjoy		
2020	"Bin Bole Baby Tu"	Single	Punjabi	Jitendra Vishwakarma, Ruhaan Rajput & Arvind Kumar	Music Video	
2020	"Mai Ni Meriye"	Single	Hindi	Lost Stories		
2020	"Jab Tum Paas Ho"	Single	Hindi	Salim – Sulaiman	Music Video	
2020	"India Together"	Single	Hindi	Gajendra Verma		
2020	"Aage Ki Soch"	Single	Hindi	Akshay The One & Shashwat Singh		
2020	"Mastiyaapa"	Bandish Bandits	Hindi	Shankar–Ehsaan–Loy	An original Indian web series on Amazon Prime Video	
2020	"Couple Goals"	Bandish Bandits	Hindi	Shankar–Ehsaan–Loy	An original Indian web series on Amazon Prime Video	
2020	"Sajan Bin"	Bandish Bandits	Hindi	Shankar–Ehsaan–Loy	An original Indian web series on Amazon Prime Video	
2020	"Sansaar"	EK	Hindi	Ricky Kej	Music Album	
2020	"Ladd Chaley"	Single	Hindi	Siddharth Mahadevan & Souumil	The Indian Express: 26/11 Stories of Strength	
2020	"Kaun Tujhe (Finding The Light)"	Single	Hindi, English	Arjun	Original Music: Amaal Mallik	
2020	"Ruperi Valut Madanchya Banaat"	Single	Marathi	Sanket Naik	Saregama Marathi, A tribute to Asha Bhosle. Original Music Director: Anil-Arun	
2020	"Jheeni Jheeni"	Bhoomi	Hindi	Salim–Sulaiman	Music Album	
2021	"Tu Kabhi Kabhi"	Songs of Love	Hindi	Amit Trivedi	Music Album	
2021	"Arakkiye"	Single	Tamil	AniVee	Music Video	
2021	"Top Tucker"	Single	Hindi, Tamil	Yuvan Shankar Raja	Music Video	
2021	"Baggage (Ishq Mushkil Hai)"	Single	Hindi, English	Arjun	Music Video	
2021	"Main Janu Na"	Single	Hindi	Arjuna Harjai	Music Video	
2021	"Chamba/Maaye Ni Meriye "	Single	Hindi	Aditya Pushkarna	Himachal Folk Song, Co-singer: Armaan Malik	
2021	"Meherma"	Single	Hindi	Samira Koppikar	Zee Music Originals	
2021	"Hum Tum"	Single	Hindi	Naresh-Anand	Times Music	
2021	"Dildariyaan"	MOODZ	Hindi	Parichay	Music Album	
2021	"Mera Jee Karda"	Single	Punjabi	J Statik	Music Video, Co-singer: Deep Jandu	
2021	"Kinni Soni"	Feels Like Ishq	Punjabi, English	Sameer Kaushal & Ayushmann Khurrana	A Netflix original series	
2021	"Na Na"	Single	Punjabi	Dj Lyan & Mickey Singh	Music Video	
2021	"Gallaan Teriyaan"	Single	Hindi	Salim–Sulaiman	Music Video	
2021	"Ganeshay Dheemahi"	Single	Sanskrit	Ajay – Atul	Times Music Spiritual, Recreated by Shailesh Dani	
2021	"Mehndi Te Vavi"	Single	Gujarati	Lost Stories	Music Video	
2021	"4 AM"	Single	Punjabi	Mickey Singh	Music Video	
2021	"Chal Koi Na (Let it Go)"	Single	Punjabi	DJ Lyan, Jay Skilly & Mickey Singh	Music Video	
2021	"Bach Ke Rehna (Red Notice)"	Single	Hindi	R. D. Burman, Badshah, DIVINE, Mikey McCleary	Music Video, Promotional Track for Red Notice (A Netflix original film)	
2021	"Belief Song"	Single	English	Souumil and Siddharth Mahadevan	Tata Consultancy Services (TCS)	
2021	"Tera Ishq"	Single	Hindi	Siddharth Parashar	Music Video	
2022	" Mujhko Pyaar Ho Gaya"	Single	Hindi	Ankit Kholia	Music Video	
2022	"Hauli Hauli"	Single	Punjabi	Charanpreet Singh	Music Video	
2022	"Yeh hai India ka YouTube"	Single	Hindi	Siddhant Mago	Music Video, YouTube Musical anthem	
2022	"Dildariyaan (Acousticz)"	Single	Hindi	Parichay	Music Album	
2022	"Duvaa Duvaa"	Suzhal -The Vortex	Tamil	Sam C. S.	Indian web series on Amazon Prime Video	
2022	"Bahaar Hai"	Beyond Bollywood	Hindi	Salim–Sulaiman	Music Album	
2022	"Honey Ke Sang"	Single	Hindi	JAM8	Roposo Jamroom	
2022	"Sitara"	Gunehgar	Hindi, English	Karan Kanchan	Music Album, Co-Singer: DIVINE Lyrics: DIVINE, Jonita Gandhi	
2022	"Pipni"	Mismatched: Season 2	Hindi	Anurag Saikia	A Netflix original series	
2022	"Hey, Enna Paarva?"	Single	Tamil	Sanjoy	Exclusively on Instagram	
2023	"Naya Sher"	Single	Punjabi	Karan Kanchan	Royal Challenge, Music Video ft. Virat Kohli, Co-singer: DIVINE.	
2023	"Sitara (Live Session)"	Gunehgar	Hindi	Karan Kanchan	Music Video, Co-Singer: DIVINE	
2023	"Dil Jashn Bole"	Single	Hindi	Pritam	2023 Cricket World Cup anthem Co-singers: Pritam, Nakash Aziz, Amit Mishra, Sreerama Chandra, AKASA and Charan.	
2024	Noorie (Two Sides)	Single	Punjabi, English	Jonita, Mitika Kanwar, Milano		
2025	"Channa"	Single	Punjabi, English	Jonita, Shayra Apoorva, Siddhant Bhosle, NEVERSOBER		
2025	"Beparwai"	Single	Punjabi, English	Jonita, Mitika Kanwar		
2025	"Ve Mundeya"	Single	Punjabi	Mitika Kanwar, Hitesh Sharma, and Milan D'Agostini	Music Video, Co-singer: Tesher	

== Filmography ==
=== Film ===
Key
†	Denotes films that have not yet been released

Year	Title	Role	Language	Notes	Ref.
2026	Dacoit: A Love Story	Rani	Telugu; Hindi	Big screen debut; bilingual film Item dancer in song "Touch Buddy" (Hindi) / "Chicchubuddi" (Telugu)	
2026	Idhayam Murali	Geetha	Tamil	Supporting role	
TBA	Walking Talking Strawberry Icecream †	Piku	Tamil; English	Debut as lead; Post-production; bilingual film	

=== Television ===
Year	Title	Role	Note
2020	Taare Zameen Par	Herself	Judge; live singing reality show
2024	Dance Plus Pro	Herself	Song promotion
