= One Heart (disambiguation) =

One Heart is a 2003 album by Celine Dion.

One Heart may also refer to:

- "One Heart" (Celine Dion song), 2003
- "One Heart" (R.I.O. song), 2010
- One Heart (Sarah Geronimo album), 2011
- One Heart (film), a concert film about A. R. Rahman and his music
