= Diamonds for Tears =

Single by Poets of the Fall

from the album Revolution Roulette
- Released: 20 May 2008 (Finland)
- Genre: Alternative rock
- Label: Insomniac
- Songwriters: Markus Kaarlonen, Marko Saaresto and Olli Tukiainen.

Poets of the Fall singles chronology
"The Ultimate Fling" (2008)	"Diamonds for Tears" (2008)	"Dreaming Wide Awake" (2010)

"Diamonds for Tears" is the second single from the album Revolution Roulette by the Finnish rock band Poets of the Fall. The single was released in Finland on 20 May 2008 and contains two versions of the title track as well as a live recording of the song Carnival of Rust and the video to the band's previous single "The Ultimate Fling".

== Track listing ==
1. Diamonds for Tears (radio edit)
2. Diamonds for Tears (album version)
3. Carnival of Rust (live)

Bonus: The Ultimate Fling music video

== Charts ==
Chart (2008)	Peak position
Finnish Singles Chart	13
