= When Chai Met Toast =

Indian indie band from Kochi

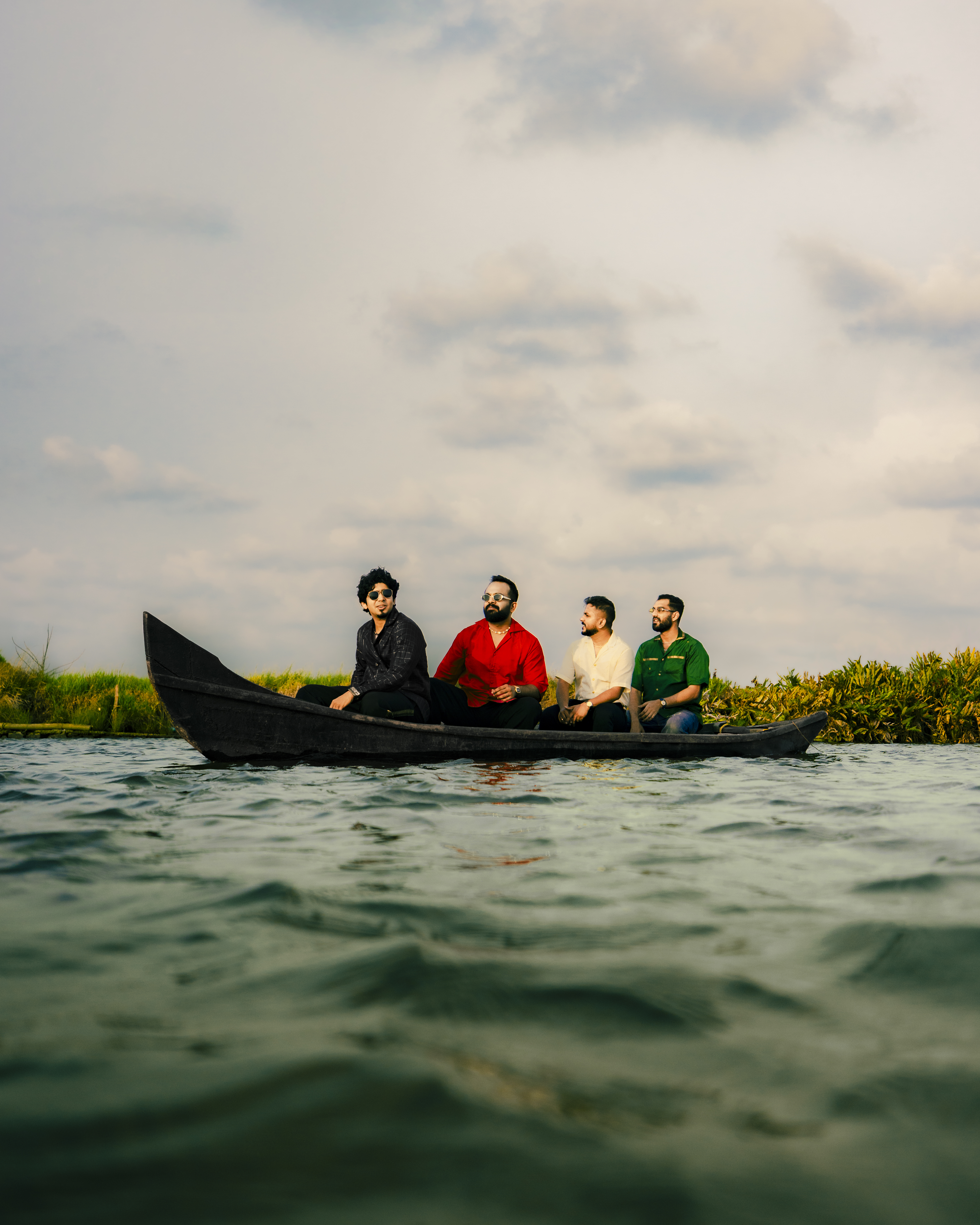
- From left to right: Achyuth Jaigopal, Palee Francis, Ashwin Gopakumar and Pai Sailesh

Background information
- Origin: Kochi, Kerala, India
- Years active: 2016–present
- Members: Ashwin Gopakumar; Achyuth Jaigopal; Palee Francis; Pai Sailesh
- Website: whenchaimettoast.com

When Chai Met Toast is a multilingual indie-folk alternative band formed in Kochi, Kerala in 2016. The band's lineup comprises vocalist Ashwin Gopakumar, guitarist Achyuth Jaigopal, keyboardist Palee Francis, and drummer Pai Sailesh. The band is known for their happy and lighthearted music which they create in English and Hindi, sometimes featuring Tamil and Malayalam lyrics.

Having released two EPs and several singles, the band has been recognized as a rising artist in Spotify’s RADAR program. The video of their single Break Free was chosen as one of VH1 India's top 50 hit videos. They have also developed the tracks for comedian Kenny Sebastian’s 2018 web series Die Trying.

When Chai Met Toast frequently performs at live events and music festivals in India, including Bacardi NH7 Weekender, SulaFest, OnePlus Music festival and Red Bull Tour Bus. In August 2021, their music was featured in the trailer of Farhan Akhtar’s upcoming Bollywood film Jee Le Zaraa.

== Band members ==
- Ashwin Gopakumar – Vocals
- Achyuth Jaigopal – Guitar and Banjo
- Palee Francis – Keyboard and Producer
- Pai Sailesh – Drums and Percussions

When Chai Met Toast discography
- Studio albums: 1
- EPs: 2
- Singles: 3
- Music videos: 3
- Nature Tapes: 3

== Discography ==
=== Singles and albums ===
Year	Type	Title	Number of Songs	Songs	Language	Notes
2017	Single	Joy of Little Things	3	Joy of Little Things; Firefly; Beautiful World	English	
2018	Single	Run Closer	1	Run Closer	English	
2018	EP	Believe	4	Khoj (Passing By); Who Are You; Believe, Forever	English, Tamil, Hindi	
2019	Single	'Hop Stomp'	1	'Hop Stomp'	English	
2019	Single	Nee Aara	1	Nee Aara	Malayalam	
2019	Single	Karam (Equals Sessions)	1	Karam (Equals Sessions)	English, Hindi	Collaborated with Rangala Sardar
2020	Single	Maybe I Can Fly	1	Maybe I Can Fly	English	
2020	Single	When We Feel Young	1	When We Feel Young	English,Hindi	
2020	Single	Kahaani	1	Kahaani	Hindi	
2020	Single	Ocean Tide	1	Ocean Tide	English	
2021	Single	Break Free	1	Break Free	English	
2021	Single	Kahaani (Duet)	1	Kahaani – Duet	Hindi	Female Vocals by Pavithra Chari
2021	Single	Yellow Paper Daisy	1	Yellow Paper Daisy	English	
2021	Album	When We Feel Young	7	Constellation; Ocean Tide; When We Feel Young; Kahaani; Remember; Break Free; Maybe I Can Fly	English, Hindi, Malayalam, Tamil	
2022	Single	Nee Aara – Red Cable Sessions	1	Nee Aara – Red Cable Sessions	English	
2022	Single	Lovin' U	1	Lovin' U	English	Released this single as a part of Instagram's #1MinMusic

=== Films ===
- Friday Night Plan (2023)
- Do Aur Do Pyaar (2024)
