= 24 (soundtrack) =

24: Original Motion Picture Soundtrack

Soundtrack album by A. R. Rahman
- Released: 8 April 2016
- Recorded: 2014–2016
- Studios: Panchathan Record Inn, Chennai; A M Studios, Chennai; A R Studios, Mumbai; Panchathan Hollywood Studios, Los Angeles
- Length: 25:52
- Languages: Tamil; Telugu; Hindi
- Labels: Eros Music; Sony Music South
- Producer: A. R. Rahman

A. R. Rahman chronology
Muhammad: The Messenger of God (2015)	24: Original Motion Picture Soundtrack (2016)	Achcham Yenbadhu Madamaiyada / Sahasam Swasaga Sagipo (2016)

Singles from 24
- 1. "Kaalam Yen Kadhali" Released: 22 February 2016; 2. "24 Carat" Released: 19 May 2016

24 is the soundtrack album, composed by A. R. Rahman with song lyrics by Vairamuthu and Madhan Karky, to the 2016 Tamil film of the same name, produced by Suriya and directed by Vikram Kumar. The album features six tracks and was released on 9 April 2016 by Eros Music, but the rights were later bought by Sony Music India.

== Background ==
In November 2014, A. R. Rahman was announced as the film soundtrack and score composer, working with Suriya for the third time after Aayutha Ezhuthu and Sillunu Oru Kaadhal. Rahman had a six-hour script narration session with Suriya and Vikram Kumar before signing the project. Recording of the track "Punnagaye" written by lyricist Vairamuthu was completed by February 2015. In an interview with The Hindu, Suriya told that the recording of one more track was completed by September 2015. According to lyricist Madhan Karky, for the track "Naan Un": Rahman was trying out a tune on his piano and Karky was writing the lyrics while listening to him. He wrote a line in Tamil, "Undhan Azhagil Iraivanai Kaankiraen" that translates to, "In Your Beauty, I See God." An inspiration before composing tunes, Rahman had read the same line from the Prophetic books before composing that track. However, the track was initially composed for some other film. Later, it was reworked to suit the film soundtrack. An additional composition written by Madhan Karky titled, "Dangerskku Hi5 Podu, Daredevilkku Vaanam Podu." was as an intro song only in the film score. However, the track was released as a bonus single under the title "24 Carat" on 19 May 2016.

== Release ==
The original and Telugu versions of the album were released at separate events held at Sathyam Cinemas in Chennai and Shilpkala Vedika in Hyderabad respectively on 9 April 2016. At the launch of original version of the album, there were live performances of songs from the film. Singer Benny Dayal sang the track "Kaalam En Kadhali", followed by Chinmayi singing "Naan Un". Shakthisree Gopalan was next with the track "Aararoo" and the Telugu version "Laalijo" was sung by actress Nithya Menen with A. R. Rahman playing the keyboard. The songs were released a day before the launch on 8 April.

== Critical response ==
Gulf News based critic Mythily Ramachandran stated: "A. R. Rahman's music grows on you and is refreshing." Latha Srinivasan of DNA India mentioned: "A. R. Rahman's songs and score add tremendous value to this script as well." Sify quoted: "Rahman's songs are big plus for the film and the maestro scores well in the BGM of Athreya's sequences, especially in the pre-climax portion." Critical review board based at Behindwoods praised the music: "The score in typical A. R. Rahman style sets the mood right for the tale." Mani Prabhu of NDTV Movies called the songs "eye popping" that fits into the entertainment." Anupama Subramaniam of Deccan Chronicle stated: "AR Rahman's background score elevates the proceedings while the songs are already a hit." Subha Shetty Saha of Mid-Day stated that the film has "melodius music" by A. R. Rahman.

Critic S. Saraswathi of Rediff stated: "The beautifully composed songs by Rahman are well picturised, but act as speed breakers to the narrative." Sreedhar Pillai, in his review for Firstpost wrote: "A. R. Rahman's background music is in sync with the theme of the film, though songs are barely hummable". In his review for The Indian Express, Goutham VS writes: "A R Rahman's background score blended perfectly with the scenes, especially when Mani's wonderstruck mind was seeking answers about the mysterious watch, but Rahman seems to have lost his magic when it comes to the songs." For his review to Filmibeat, Avinash Gopinath noted: "AR Rahman's music is not up to the mark. While background score is only average, his songs are made bearable by brilliant visuals."

Baradwaj Rangan, in his review for The Hindu, wrote that the numbers by A. R. Rahman are lead up to only for the film. M. Suganth of The Times of India wrote: "AR Rahman disappoints with a rather serviceable score." Arathi Kanan for the online newspaper Manorama wrote: "Rahman interludes are welcome. However, the routine placement of the songs are boring."

== Track listing ==
Note–The order of tracks on the digital and physical versions of the album are different. The track listing below is according to the digital versions of the soundtrack album.

=== Tamil ===
24 (Tamil) [Original Motion Picture Soundtrack]
No.	Title	Lyrics	Singer(s)	Length
1.	"Naan Un"	Madhan Karky	Arijit Singh, Chinmayi Sripada	4:48
2.	"Mei Nigara"	Madhan Karky	Sid Sriram, Sanah Moidutty, Jonita Gandhi	5:16
3.	"Punnagaye"	Vairamuthu	Haricharan, Shashaa Tirupati	4:16
4.	"Aararoo"	Madhan Karky	Shakthisree Gopalan	3:41
5.	"My Twin Brother"	Vikram Kumar	Srinivasa Krishnan, Hriday Gattani	3:28
6.	"Kaalam Yen Kadhali"	Vairamuthu	Benny Dayal, Shashwat Singh, Abhay Jodhpurkar	4:23
Total length:				25:52

24 (Tamil) – Bonus track
No.	Title	Lyrics	Singer(s)	Length
1.	"24 Carat"	Madhan Karky	Arjun Chandy	3:40
Total length:				29:34

=== Telugu ===
All lyrics are written by Chandrabose, except track 5.

24 (Telugu) [Original Motion Picture Soundtrack]
No.	Title	Singer(s)	Length
1.	"Laalijo"	Nithya Menen	3:42
2.	"Manasuke"	Sid Sriram, Sanah Moidutty, Jonita Gandhi	5:17
3.	"Deivam Raasina Kavitha"	Haricharan, Jonita Gandhi	4:17
4.	"Prema Swaramulalo"	Hriday Gattani, Chinmayi Sripada	4:49
5.	"My Twin Brother"	Srinivasa Krishnan, Hriday Gattani	3:29
6.	"Kaalam Na Preyasile"	Benny Dayal	4:23
Total length:			25:57

24 (Telugu) – Bonus track
No.	Title	Lyrics	Singer(s)	Length
1.	"24 Carat"	Madhan Karky	Arjun Chandy	3:40
Total length:				29:39

== Personnel ==
Credits adapted from CD liner notes of the soundtrack album.

Backing Vocals Dr. Narayanan, D. Sathya Prakash, Nivas, Santhosh Hariharan, Deepak, Maalavika Sundar, Pooja Vaidyanath, Sharanya Srinivas, Sowmya Mahadevan, Suzanne D'Mello, S. Kousihan, Gary Mesquitta, Alan D'Souza, Hrishikesh Kamerkar, Lara Pinto, Keshia Braganza, Poorvi Koutish

Personnel

- Strings: The Sunshine Chamber Group
- Indian Rhythm: T. Raja Kumar, Neelagandhan, Vedha, Chinna Prasad
- Flute: Kareem, Kamalakar
- Guitars: Keba Jeremiah
- Cello: V. Sekar
- Kora: Keba Jeremiah

Production

- Record Producer: A. R. Rahman
- Mastering: Suresh Permal
- Strings conductor: V. J. Srinivasamurthy (at AM Studios, Chennai)
- Engineers:
  - Suresh Permal, Vinay Sridhar, Srinidhi Venkatesh, Karthik Sekaran, Vinay Sridhar (at Panchathan Record Inn, Chennai)
  - S. Sivakumar, Pradeep Menon, Kannan Ganpat, Krishnan Subramanian, Karthik Sekaran (at AM Studios, Chennai)
  - Nitish R. Kumar, Hari Krishnan (at A R Studios)
  - Tony Joy, Kevin Doucette (at Panchathan Hollywood Studios)
- Mixing: T. R. Krishna Chetan, Nitish R. Kumar, Ishaan Chhabra
- Additional Programming: Hentry Kuruvilla, T. R. Krishna Chetan, Ishaan Chhabra, Jerry Vincent, Samir D. Santhosh
- Music co-ordinators: Noell James, Vijay Iyer
- Musicians' fixer: R. Samidurai
