= Zaeden =

Indian singer and record producer

- Born: Sahil Sharma; Gurgaon, Haryana, India
- Genre: I-pop • Pop • Dance-pop • electronic
- Occupation: Singer • Producer • DJ • Sound Engineer
- Years active: 2014–present
- Labels: Universal Music, Warner Music Group, Spinnin', VYRL Originals
- Website: zaedenmusic.com

Sahil Sharma (born 2 July 1995), better known by his stage name Zaeden, is an Indian singer and record producer.

== Early life and career beginnings ==
Zaeden was born in Gurugram, India. Growing up, he attended The Heritage School, where he played the tabla and piano throughout school. At the age of 14, he began performing as a DJ. He briefly studied mass communication at Amity University, Noida before relocating to Mumbai to study sound engineering.

Sharma stated that his given name was too common in India, and so he chose the stage name "Zaeden" as it meant "out of the box thinking" in Latin.

== Personal life ==
Zaeden got married on October 26, 2024, to DJ Nina Shah in an intimate wedding ceremony held in Goa.

== Career ==
Sharma began his career at the age of 14, by mixing tapes of dance music releases and distributing them among his friends, which led him to release his first single titled "Land of Lords" in 2014. That same year, his remix of Coldplay's "Magic" aired on Dutch DJ Hardwell's radio show Hardwell On Air, making him one of the youngest DJs to be featured on the show. He further released his official remix of Maroon 5's single "Don't Wanna Know" that year.

In 2015, he signed with Spinnin' Records and released his single "Yesterday," a collaborative effort with American DJ Borgeous.

In 2016, Sharma was a closing act for DJ David Guetta's Mumbai concert. That same year, he became one of the few Indian artists to have performed at the Tomorrowland Festival in Belgium, where he premiered "Yesterday" along with his remix of Justin Bieber's "Love Yourself." In July of that year, Sharma released his second single under Spinnin' titled "Never Let You Go," a collaborative effort with DJ duo Nina & Malika. The track featured vocals by Cimo Frankel, and the subsequent music video was shot across Europe. He was also featured on GQ magazine's 'Best Dressed List 2016' and MensXP's list of ‘Top 50 Indians who defined fashion in 2016.' He also spoke at the TEDx conference at The Heritage School that year.

In 2017, Sharma released his official remix of Maroon 5's collaborative effort with American rapper Kendrick Lamar, "Don't Wanna Know." He also released his third single titled "City of the Lonely Hearts" featuring Cimo Frankel. That same year, he was one of the opening acts for the Mumbai date on Justin Bieber's Purpose World Tour.

On 5 September 2019, Zaeden released his first Hindi non-film song, "tere bina" on VYRL, Universal Music along with a music video featuring Amyra Dastur. A few weeks later, he released its acoustic version with Jonita Gandhi. A regular performer at Tomorrowland, he debuted "tere bina" during his third appearance there.

He went on to release four more singles, "kya karoon?", "dooriyan", "intezaar," and "socha na tha". He also collaborated with Lost Stories for "Noor," and Sez on the Beat for "Kahaani 2020". In 2021, he released his debut album titled Genesis 1:1. It featured 11 tracks.

The 25-year-old has been featured on GQ's Best Dressed and MensXP's ‘Top 50 Indians who defined fashion in 2016’ list. He has collaborated with designers Shantanu & Nikhil, and Siddhartha Tytler.

In 2023, He launched his own fragrance brand "SOL".

In 2026, Zaeden was announced as the lead in Dono Mile Iss Tarah, an upcoming romantic drama series from Karan Johar's Dharmatic Entertainment for Amazon Prime Video. The series marks his acting debut.

== Discography ==
=== Albums ===
- Genesis 1:1 (2021)

| Year | Album | Song | Co-singer |
|---|---|---|---|
| 2014 | Non-album single | Land of Lords | Syzz |
| 2015 | | Yesterday | Borgeous |
| 2016 | | Never Let You Go | Nina & Malika |
| 2017 | | City of the Lonely Hearts | Cimo Fränkel |
| 2017 | | Tere Jaane Se | Ankit Tiwari |
| 2018 | | Tempted to Touch | Rupee |
| 2018 | | Something like | Yves V, Jermaine Fleur |
| 2018 | | Uncomplicated | Lost Stories, Matthew Steeper |
| 2019 | | tere bina | |
| 2019 | | tere bina (Acoustic) | Jonita Gandhi |
| 2020 | Genesis 1:1 | kya karoon? | |
| 2020 | Genesis 1:1 | dooriyan | |
| 2020 | | Kahaani 2020 | Sez on the Beat, Enkore, yungsta, Lit Happu, Shayan Roy |
| 2020 | | Noor | Lost Stories, Akanksha Bhandari |
| 2020 | Genesis 1:1 | intezaar | somanshu |
| 2020 | Genesis 1:1 | socha na tha | |
| 2020 | | for Christmas | Natania |
| 2021 | Genesis 1:1 | yaadein | AAKASH |
| 2021 | Genesis 1:1 | 1000 pieces | Polar |
| 2021 | Genesis 1:1 | jaaye na tu | Nishu |
| 2021 | Genesis 1:1 | KTMBK | Hanita Bhambari |
| 2021 | Genesis 1:1 | days | |
| 2021 | Genesis 1:1 | kho gaya | Yashraj, AAKASH |
| 2021 | | Settle Down | Fly By Midnight |
| 2021 | | Setting Sail (Soundtrack from "Modern Love" Season 2) | Lisa Mishra |
| 2022 | | Paas Aa | AAKASH |
| 2022 | | Lagda Na | Stunnah Beatz |
| 2023 | | Aa Mil | Lisa Mishra |
| 2023 | | jaana | |
| 2023 | | Dreams | |
| 2024 | | 5 am | |
| 2024 | | Aawara | King, Kshmr |
| 2024 | | pia <3 | |
| 2024 | | Deewana | |
| 2025 | | Raaz | |
