= Do Aur Do Pyaar =

2024 Indian film by Shirsha Guha Thakurta

- Theatrical release poster
- Directed by: Shirsha Guha Thakurta
- Written by: Suprotim Sengupta; Amrita Bagchi; Eisha Chopra
- Produced by: Sameer Nair; Deepak Segal; Tanuj Garg; Atul Kasbekar; Swati Iyer Chawla
- Starring: Vidya Balan; Pratik Gandhi; Ileana D'Cruz; Sendhil Ramamurthy
- Cinematography: Kartik Vijay
- Edited by: Bardroy Barretto
- Music by: Lost Stories (DJs); The Local Train; Subhajit Mukherjee; Abhishek–Ananya; When Chai Met Toast
- Production companies: Applause Entertainment; Ellipsis Entertainment Production
- Distributed by: AA Films
- Release date: 19 April 2024
- Running time: 137 minutes
- Country: India
- Language: Hindi
- Box office: est. ₹4.63 crore

Do Aur Do Pyaar (transl. Two plus two equals love) is a 2024 Indian Hindi-language romantic comedy film directed by Shirsha Guha Thakurta, in her directorial debut and produced by Sameer Nair, Deepak Segal, Tanuj Garg, Atul Kasbekar and Swati Iyer Chawla under the banner Applause Entertainment and Ellipsis Entertainment Production. It features Vidya Balan, Pratik Gandhi, Ileana D'Cruz and Sendhil Ramamurthy.

The film was theatrically released on 19 April 2024 to positive reviews from critics.

== Plot ==
Kavya Ganeshan, a dentist, and Anirrudh "Ani" Banerjee, an industrialist, have been married for 12 years. Although they had a love marriage, their marriage has fallen apart because they no longer find it exciting with each other. They have also had affairs for years outside the marriage. Kavya is with Vikram, a successful photographer who moved from New York to Mumbai for her. Anirrudh is with Nora, a struggling theatre artist. Kavya and Anirrudh continue to live together and both don't have the heart to ask the other for divorce. One day, Kavya's grandfather passes away due to old age. Anirrudh insists on going with her to Ooty for the funeral. Kavya and her family are estranged as she eloped with Anirrudh, bringing shame to the respected Ganeshan family. The family is waiting for Karthik, Kavya’s brother who was very close to the grandfather, to arrive from Los Angeles to complete the final rites in his presence. Continuous arguments keep happening between Kavya and her father. After one such argument, Kavya leaves the house and Anirrudh goes with her. They go to a hotel where they used to go when dating. They get drunk and start enjoying themselves. They return drunk to the house late at night and start making out in a room. Suddenly all the lights are switched on, turns out Karthik has just arrived and they were making out in the same room where the dead body had been kept. The funeral takes place the next day, and Kavya and Anirrudh return to Mumbai. They feel extremely attracted to each other and have sex with each other after years. They start having sex with each other and start ignoring their respective affairs. Their partners start noticing this, with Vikram coming to their apartment building secretly and seeing Anirrudh. Kavya and Anirrudh continue this. Anirrudh attends a call on Kavya's mobile phone from a broker who asks if he should confirm the booking of an apartment in her and Vikram's name. Anirrudh confirms the booking as Vikram, thus finding out that Kavya is having an affair. Nora frustrated with Anirrudh, meets Kavya at her hospital and tells her that Anirrudh will leave her. Now they have both found out about each other's respective affairs and confront each other about it. A heated argument takes place. Anirrudh explains that he had to change after his father died and he had to take care of the business and leave his music. Kavya says that he didn't have to change and that his change caused them to drift apart from each other. They agree to get divorced and sell their apartment. A year later, the deal for their apartment has been finalised so Kavya comes one last time to the apartment. She gets a call from Anirrudh and he also comes to the apartment. Kavya broke up with Vikram immediately after she and Anirrudh separated and went on a Europe tour. Anirrudh and Nora's relationship didn't last very long once she became famous. Anirrudh and Kavya have take out dinner on their balcony and keep having fun with each other and laughing.

== Cast ==
- Vidya Balan as Kavya Ganeshan
- Pratik Gandhi as Anirrudh “Ani” Banerjee
- Ileana D'Cruz as Nora Kaushal
- Sendhil Ramamurthy as Vikram Sehgal
- Thalaivasal Vijay as Venkat
- Rekha Kudligi as Savitri
- Gireesh Krish Nair as Karthik
- Kumaradas T. N. as Pulli
- Hitha Chandrashekhar as Lata
- Priti Shroff as Aditi
- Dipika Pandey as Sumi
- Akshay Sharad Bhagat as Mapuskar
- S. Subrahmoniam as Periappa
- Sheela Shetty as Sudha Athai
- P. Nambi as Ranjan Chitappa
- Kamala as Paati
- Arun Ajikumar as Surya
- K. Rajan as Krishnan Chittapa
- Janhavi Jagdish Joshi as Rama aunty
- Veenah Nair as Swati
- Suma Murali Rao as Lalita Chittapa

== Production ==
=== Filming ===
Principal photography commenced in November 2021 and wrapped in Ooty, in December 2021.

== Soundtrack ==
The soundtrack is composed by Lost Stories (DJs), The Local Train, Subhajit Mukherjee, Abhishek-Ananya and When Chai Met Toast. Lyrics is written by Kunaal Vermaa, Paras Thakur (The Local Train), Trina Mukherjee, Manoj Yadav, Ankur Tewari, Abhiruchi Chand, Azazul Haque, Subhajit Mukherjee. Singer Lucky Ali made his comeback to Bollywood after 9 years with the song "Tu Hain Kahaan"; prior to this Ali had last sung for Bollywood in 2015 for the movie Tamasha. The Song "Tu Hain Kahaan" was recorded in Bangalore where Ali resides.

Do Aur Do Pyaar

Soundtrack album by Lost Stories (DJs) The Local Train When Chai Met Toast Subhajit Mukherjee Abhishek-Ananya
- Released: 25 April 2024
- Recorded: 2023–2024
- Genre: Feature film soundtrack
- Length: 22:15
- Language: Hindi
- Label: Panorama Music

Track listing
No.	Title	Lyrics	Music	Singer(s)	Length
1.	"Jaazbati Hai Dil"	Kunaal Vermaa	Lost Stories (DJs)	Armaan Malik, Ananya Birla	3:12
2.	"Tu Hai Kahaan"	The Local Train	The Local Train	Lucky Ali	3:40
3.	"Ta Ra Ta Ra Ta"	Trina Mukherjee	Shubhajit Mukherjee	Vishal Dadlani	4:52
4.	"Teri Meri Ye Kahaani"	Abhiruchi Chand	Abhishek-Ananya	Vivek Hariharan, Ananya Purkayastha	2:33
5.	"Aa Bhi Jaa"	Ankur Tewari	When Chai Met Toast	When Chai Met Toast	3:04
6.	"Jaaney Do"	Azazul Haque	Subhajit Mukherjee	Tushar Joshi	2:52
7.	"Do Kinare"	Manoj Yadav	Abhishek-Ananya	Shubham Shirule	4:03

== Release ==
=== Theatrical ===
The film theatrically released on 19 April 2024.

=== Home media ===
The film was premiered on Disney+ Hotstar from 14 June 2024.

== Reception ==
On the review aggregator website Rotten Tomatoes, 86% of 14 critics' reviews are positive, with an average rating of 6.3/10.

Sukanya Verma of Rediff.com rated 3.5/5 stars and observed "Pratik Gandhi's emotional range makes him a treat to watch while Vidya is as wild as she's wise." Shubhra Gupta of The Indian Express gave 2.5 stars out of 5 and said in her review that "Vidya Balan, who expectedly gets top billing, is all practiced ease in the romantic-comedy, and lacks a certain sizzle, but springs to life intermittently" The critic based at Bollywood Hungama rated the film 2 stars out of 5 and wrote, "Do Aur Do Pyaar works due to the relatable plot and electrifying chemistry between Vidya Balan and Pratik Gandhi." Bhavna Agarwal of India Today rated 4/5 stars and stated in her review that "The biggest strength of the Vidya Balan and Pratik Gandhi film lies in its intimate storytelling and relatable characters" Dhaval Roy of The Times of India rated 3.5/5 and said "Do Aur Do Pyaar falters with its uneven pacing, especially in the latter half. Despite this, the stellar performances, humour-infused script, and beautiful visuals make it a watchable romantic comedy." Monika Rawal Kukreja of Hindustan Times said Do Aur do Pyaar is more than simply a lighthearted rom-com that skirts serious topics; it's also a sarcastic look at contemporary couples and their relationships. It's a far more sophisticated and daring story that, while maintaining its central humour, communicates and examines the rawness of relationships. See it for some charming, carefree acting and straightforward, yet powerful storyline.
