= Akhil Iyer =

Indian actor (born 1987)

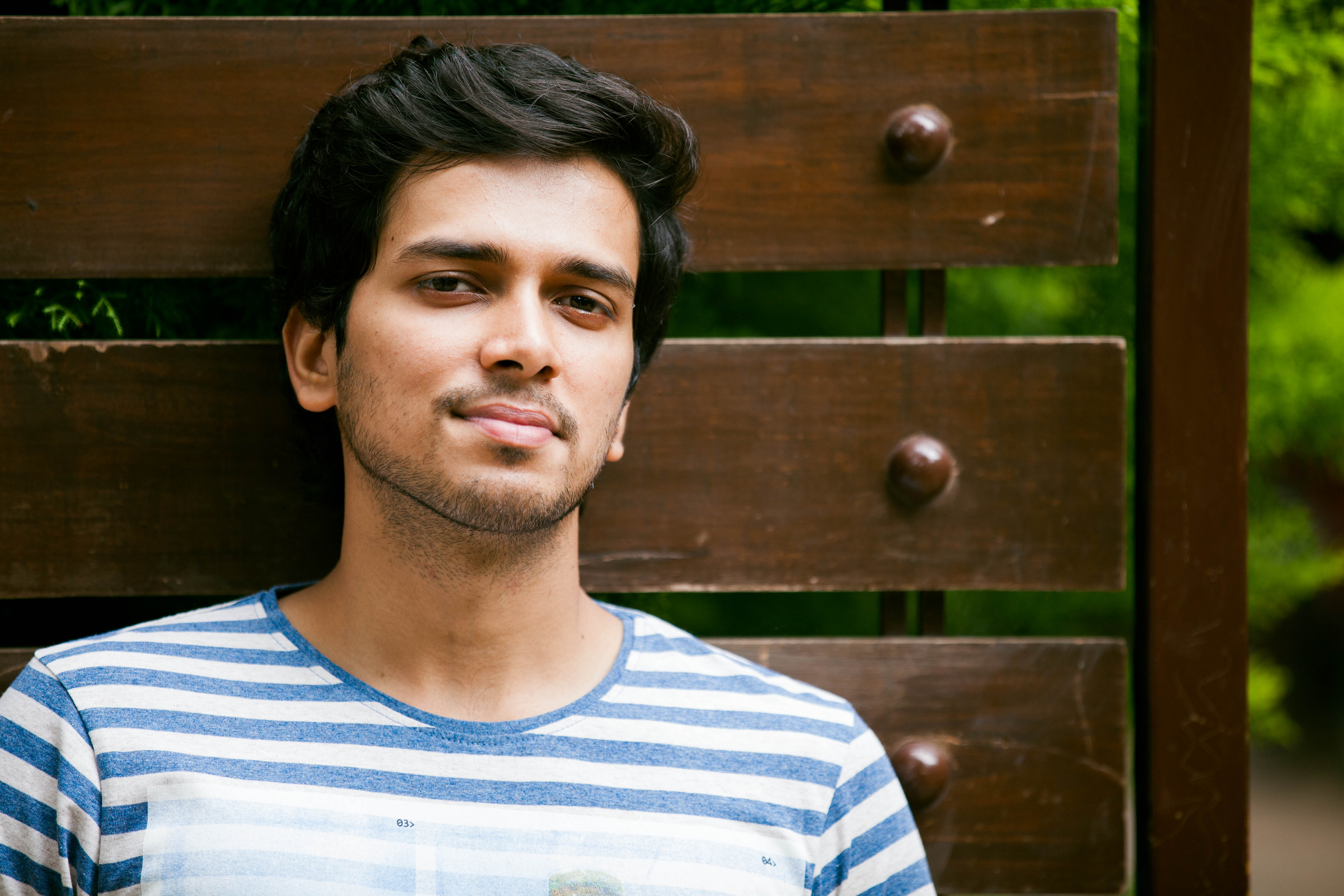
- Born: 3 October 1987 (age 38); Bangalore, India
- Occupation: Actor
- Years active: 2013–present

Akhil Iyer is an Indian actor appearing in Bollywood films and TV commercials. He played the role of Rohit Rao in the Hindi HIT – The first case, also starring Rajkumar rao and Sanya Malhotra. He made his Bollywood debut in Lekar Hum Deewana Dil (2014) in a supporting role.

== Early life ==
Born in October 1987, Akhil grew up in Bangalore, Ram Iyer, is an orthopaedic surgeon while his mother, Asha Iyer, is a gynaecologist. Akhil has one brother. Akhil did his schooling at St. Joseph's Boys' High School, Bangalore where he played cricket at the zonal level. Akhil went on to finish his education in computer science engineering from P.E.S. Institute of Technology, Bangalore South Campus (formerly known as PES School of Engineering, Bangalore)

== Career ==
Akhil started his career in Bollywood with the film Lekar Hum Deewana Dil playing the role of Mahesh for which he received critical praise. While he was based out of Bangalore, Akhil pursued his passion for acting with theatre groups like Dramanon & Artists Repertoire Theatre up til 2011. He then moved to Chennai where he signed Iruvar Ondranal and Nijama Nizhala. In 2013, Akhil made the move to Mumbai after signing Lekar Hum Deewana Dil.

In 2024, Akhil and his wife opened the restaurant Benne in Bandra.

== Filmography ==
Year	Film	Role	Language	Notes
2014	Lekar Hum Deewana Dil	Mahesh	Hindi	
2015	Iruvar Ondranal		Tamil	
2016	Nijama Nizhala		Tamil	
2020	The Forgotten Army	Sridhar	Hindi	series
2022	HIT: The First Case	Rohit Rao	Hindi	
