= The Sky Is Pink (soundtrack) =

Soundtrack album by Pritam
- Released: 7 October 2019
- Genre: Feature film soundtrack
- Length: 21:08
- Language: Hindi
- Label: Zee Music Company

Pritam chronology
Chhichhore (2019)	The Sky Is Pink (2019)	Love Aaj Kal (2020)
External audio
- Audio Jukebox on YouTube

The Sky Is Pink is the soundtrack to the 2019 film of the same name directed by Shonali Bose and stars Priyanka Chopra Jonas, Farhan Akhtar, Zaira Wasim and Rohit Suresh Saraf. The soundtrack featured musical score composed by Pritam with lyrics written by Gulzar and was released on 7 October 2019 through Zee Music Company.

== Development ==
In an interaction to The Hindu, Bose said that there are two aspects to the film's music: both the songs and the original score. The latter is composed by Mikey McCleary whom he collaborated with Bose in Margarita with a Straw (2014). She stated that she liked Pritam's compositions from Dhoom (2004) to Dangal (2016) but was skeptical that whether their chemistry would be right. Hence, she and the film's producer Siddharth Roy Kapur met Pritam to narrate the story. Pritam felt emotionally connected to Shonali's narration and her personal experiences, while also attached with Aisha Chaudhary's story, he agreed to do the film. Bose also roped in Gulzar to write the lyrics for the songs, whom Pritam collaborates with after twelve years since Just Married (2007). She described the music as both challenging and rewarding, explaining how the songs and score go hand in hand and the latter would become a counter intuitive to the visuals. She highlighted the funeral scene as an example, which she called it as "utterly unexpected".

According to Pritam, the song "Zindagi" is a rare number he composed lyrics, as "normally, lyricists write on the tune. But there are times where I've composed as per the lyrics" citing "Mauja Hi Mauja" from Jab We Met (2007) and "Phir Le Aya Dil" from Barfi! (2012) which required scanning during composition. But "Zindagi" was more challenging as Gulzar suggested him not to change or rearrange a word. Hence, he composed it completely according to the writing.

== Release ==
The music video for the first song "Dil Hi to Hai" was released on 21 September 2019, while it was also uploaded as a digital single. It showcased the romantic relationship between Jonas and Akhtar. The second song "Pink Gulabi Sky", a dance number featuring the principal cast, was released on 27 September. The soundtrack album, that features five songs including the previous singles, was released by Zee Music Company on 7 October 2019. Albeit not being a part of the main soundtrack, the film features the song "For Aisha" in the closing credits; it was composed by Aisha's brother Ishaan Chaudhary under his band name "Memba" and sung by Nooran Sisters, Naomi Wild and Evan Giia. Anvita Dutt wrote the lyrics with Memba, Wild and Giia. The song was later released as a single on 25 October.

== Reception ==
Debarati S Sen of The Times of India called the album "powerful", particularly praising the composition and the spellbinding lyrics of the song "Dil Hi Toh Hai". The review also complimented the "silk-like smooth" vocals of Mitra and Singh's "slow rock-like" performance on the duet. Vipin Nair of The Hindu called it a "hummable soundtrack" that "traverses familiar territories, but is an eminently enjoyable work", and said it is Pritam's best work of 2019 to that point. Nair declared "Zindagi" to be his favorite song on the album, noting its "beautiful melody" that almost "feels like a ghazal at times". Swarup Chakravarthy of BollySpice stated that the album "portrays a heavy subject in a light way" as the film, but felt that most of the songs being inspired or either repetitive, and would have been a "perfect accompaniment" if those issues were rectified.

In the film review for Variety, Dennis Harvey felt that the music "leans heavily on such instruments of twee as accordions, whistling and pseudo-1920s Western dance music". Critics at The Hollywood Reporter felt that "the constant use of cheerful pop and country music to take the maudlin edge off is enervating". Kate Erbland of IndieWire wrote "A whimsical score from Bollywood composer Pritam makes it feel light".

== Accolades ==
Award (Note: Awards, festivals and organizations are in alphabetical order.)	Date of ceremony (Note: Date is linked to the article about the awards held that year, wherever possible.)	Category	Recipient(s)	Result	Ref.
FOI Online Awards	11 February 2020	Best Background Score	Mikey McCleary	Nominated	
FOI Online Awards	11 February 2020	Best Original Song	"Dil Hi Toh Hai" – Pritam and Gulzar	Nominated	
FOI Online Awards	11 February 2020	Best Lyricist	Gulzar – "Dil Hi Toh Hai"	Nominated	
International Indian Film Academy Awards	24 November 2021	Best Male Playback Singer	Arijit Singh – "Dil Hi Toh Hai"	Nominated	

== Track listing ==
No.	Title	Singer(s)	Length
1.	"Dil Hi Toh Hai"	Arijit Singh, Antara Mitra	4:40
2.	"Nadaaniyaan"	Arjun Kanungo, Lisa Mishra	4:18
3.	"Zindagi"	Arijit Singh	4:09
4.	"Pink Gulaabi Sky"	Shashwat Singh, Jonita Gandhi	3:20
5.	"Dil Hi Toh Hai" (Reprise)	Sreerama Chandra, Antara Mitra	4:41
Total length:			21:08

Bonus track
No.	Title	Lyrics	Music	Singer(s)	Length
6.	"For Aisha"	Memba, Anvita Dutt, Naomi Wild, Evan Giia	Memba	Nooran Sisters, Naomi Wild, Evan Giia	5:57
Total length:					27:05
