= Iruvar Ondranal =

2015 Indian film by Anbu

- Theatrical release poster
- Directed by: Anbu G.
- Written by: Anbu G.
- Produced by: A. M. Sampath Kumar
- Starring: P. R. Prabhu; Krithika Malini
- Cinematography: Kumar Sridhar
- Music by: Guru Krishnan
- Production company: Ramana Arts
- Release date: 29 May 2015
- Country: India
- Language: Tamil

Iruvar Ondranal (transl. When two people become one) is a 2015 Indian Tamil-language romantic comedy film directed by Anbu G. and starring P.R. Prabhu and Krithika.

== Cast ==
- P. R. Prabhu as Kaushik
- Krithika Malini as Oviya
- Akil
- Deekshitha
- Shravya Kag
- Janani
- Karthika
- Shyloo

== Production ==
Anbu G, the director/writer, and P. R. Prabhu, the lead actor, both worked as assistant directors under AR Murugadoss. Hindi actor Akhil Iyer played the second lead in the film, marking his Tamil debut. Prabhu's girlfriend Krithika Malini was also cast in the lead. They both married before the release of the film and their marriage video was used in the film. The film was shot on film to get more enhanced colour features that is not as good on digital technology.

== Soundtrack ==
The music is composed by Guru Krishnan and features lyrics by Neela Megham, Karthik Netha, Krishna Iyer and Viveka.

- "Va Va Oviya" – Karthik
- "Silu Silu" – Benny Dayal
- "Eno Unnai" – Sunitha Sarathy
- "Mudhal Murai" – Nikhil Mathew
- "Friendship Friendship" – Krishna Iyer
- "Vandhana Vadhanamey" – Baba Sehgal

== Critical reception ==
Malini Mannath of The New Indian Express wrote that "With a viewing time of a crisp 114 minutes, the film is refreshing in its take, and a pleasant watch". Anupama Subramanian of Deccan Chronicle opined that "In Iruvar Ondranal, good dialogues, three dimensional characters, and a deeper understanding on part of Anbu illuminates the real and the believable in life".
