= Carnival of Rust (song) =

Single by Poets of the Fall

from the album Carnival of Rust
- Released: 22 March 2006
- Genre: Post-grunge
- Length: 4:20
- Label: Insomniac; Playground
- Songwriters: Markus Kaarlonen, Marko Saaresto, Olli Tukiainen

Poets of the Fall singles chronology
"'Lift'" (2004)	"Carnival of Rust" (2006)	"'Sorry Go 'Round'" (2006)

"Carnival of Rust" is the first single and the title track of the Carnival of Rust album by the Finnish rock band Poets of the Fall. It was released in Finland on 22 March 2006 and in Germany on 1 December 2006. The single contains two versions of the track and a live recording of the song "Don't Mess With Me" from the band's first album Signs of Life. The track was recorded on 15 July 2005 at Rockperry Festival in Vaasa, Finland.

The song has gained a significant amount of success by immediately hitting the number one on YleX's Most Wanted and staying on top of the list for four months. The song reached number 2 in the official Finnish single charts as well as the most wanted song of 2006 on YleX and was #1 in overall sales/radio/video/disco play list according to the Finnish music book Sisältää Hitin and #1 in the radio play list on Rumba's 50 Hits list.

== Track listing ==
- Extended play
1. "Carnival of Rust" (Radio Edit) – 3:31
2. "Carnival of Rust" (Album Version) – 4:20
3. "Don't Mess With Me" (Live) – 5:33
- Digital download – remix single
1. "Carnival of Rust" (Lost Stories) Remix – 5:40

== Music video ==
"Carnival of Rust" video was released on 30 March 2006. It was added as a bonus to the Carnival of Rust album and then made available online on 8 September 2006 (watch it). It was made by the same director, who shot "Lift", Tuomas "Stobe" Harju.

=== Awards ===
Year	Award	Title
2006	The Voice	Best Music Video 2006
2006	TV2's Musiikki-TV	Best Finnish Music Video of All Times
2007	Muuvi Awards	Bronze Muuvi Award
2007	Muuvi Awards	Muuvi People's Choice Award

== Charts ==
Chart (2006)	Peak position
Finnish Singles Chart	2
