= Lost Stories (DJs) =

Indian duo DJs

- Origin: India
- Genres: Progressive house; Electro house; Future bass; Tropical house; Dance-Pop
- Occupations: DJs; Producers; Musicians
- Years active: 2008 - present
- Labels: UMG; Spinnin'; SOURCE; Black Hole; SongBird; Dharma Worldwide; Interscope
- Members: Prayag Mehta; Rishab Joshi
- Website: www.loststories.in

Lost Stories is an Indian DJ and music production duo composed of Prayag Mehta and Rishab Joshi. They are best known for their ability to uniquely blend Indian folk sounds with electronic music. Some of their most popular tracks are "Bombay Dreams" with KSHMR, "Mahi" with Kavita Seth, their official remix of Alan Walker's "Faded", their edit of "Vaseegara" with Jonita Gandhi's vocals, "Mai Ni Meriye" with Jonita Gandhi and Ashwin Adwani, and their official remix of Marshmello and Demi Lovato's "OK Not To Be OK".

Lost Stories also teach music production and DJing at Lost Stories Academy in Mumbai, Maharashtra.

== Career ==
They have performed at the Tomorrowland Music Festival (Belgium) four times. In 2018 they played at Tiesto's Musical Freedom stage alongside Zaeden and in the following year, they played at Smash The House stage curated by Dimitri Vegas & Like Mike.

Lost Stories were the face of Budweiser's Freedom campaign to Tomorrowland. They played at and promoted the premiere of Will Smith's Bright for Netflix. They have been brand ambassadors for Jack & Jones, Absolut and did a multi-city tour with Chivas. They were also a part of Belvedere's Global Studio B campaign and licensed Reveal Yourself as the Studio B anthem.

Prayag and Rishab began their journey down the dance music back in 2008, garnering support from heavyweights like Tiesto, Armin van Buuren, BT, and Markus Schulz.

They then evolved their sound with their debut album - Music for the # Generation in 2012 which was the no. 3 album on Top 100 Dance Album iTunes Charts. Ever since they've had three #1 singles on iTunes and remixed the likes of One Republic, Afrojack, Alan Walker and U2.

They were ranked no. 52 on DJ Mag Top 100 polls in 2016, making them the second ever Indian act to feature on the list.

Lost Stories' "Vaseegara/Zara Zara" edit of Jonita Gandhi's vocals and Sub Urban's "Cradles" went viral after they premiered it during the Alan Walker Aviation tour in India. An online petition was started on Change.org by one of their fans for them to release it and eventually, they put it out as a part of an EP called lo/st tapes v1 on their YouTube channel. Rishab Joshi from Lost Stories said, "I made these edits exclusively for my DJ sets and I had no plans of releasing them. From a petition to release this flip, to getting covered on national news and finally being called out by Madhavan to put this out, we had to give this to you." The EP also contained their edits of "Aaja" and "For Aisha."

In May 2020, Lost Stories became the first Indians to be announced as a part of YouTube's Foundry programme.

In October 2020, they remixed Marshmello and Demi Lovato's "OK Not To Be OK", which is also one of their most popular releases, and their most successful collaboration with any international artist/s till date.

== Releases ==
Their debut studio album, Music For The # Generation released on 23 August 2013.

Their remix of the track Afrojack featuring Spree Wilson - "The Spark" was featured in the official music video of the single.

On 26 April 2016, they released a remix of the song "Carnival of Rust" by Poets of the Fall.

On 6 August 2016, they released an Indian/Tropical themed remix of Alan Walker's "Faded".

They released an official remix of "Wherever I go" by OneRepublic on 23 September.

On 22 April 2017, they released a remix of another Alan Walker track, "Alone".

On 4 August 2017, they released a song titled "Spread The Fire", featuring vocals from American singer Marc Wulf.

On 10 May 2018, they released a three-track EP titled Bombay Electric.

On 5 July 2018, they put out "Faking It" featuring Matthew Steeper on JioSaavn's in-house label, Artist Originals.

Lost Stories and Armaan Malik released a cover of Justin Bieber's "Sorry" that crossed over a million views on YouTube .

On 30 November 2018, Lost Stories and Zaeden released a collaboration named "Uncomplicated" featuring vocals from Matthew Steeper.

On 18 March 2019, they released their first single of the year, "Mahi", featuring vocals from Indian classical/folk musician Kavita Seth, via KSHMR's label Dharma Worldwide, making it their first release on the label. First premiered in 2015, this became one of their most sought out and anticipated works. They teamed up with KSHMR and with Kavita Seth again for "Bombay Dreams", that released on 13 September 2019.

Lost Stories also remixed U2's "Love Is Bigger Than Anything In Its Way" and released it on 14 December, right before the Irish band performed their debut gig in India.

In April 2020 they released their remix of Armaan Malik's debut English single, "Control" on Arista records followed by "Mai Ni Meriye" featuring Jonita Gandhi and Ashwin Adwani in May 2020 on JioSaavn's record label, Artist Originals.

In October 2020, they released an official remix of Marshmello and Demi Lovato's "OK Not to Be OK", which was very well received by audiences and went on to become one of their most popular tracks.

== Discography ==
=== Studio albums ===
Title
Music For the # Generation
Details
- Release date: 23 August 2013
- Label: UMG India
Track listing

| No. | Title | Length |
|---|---|---|
| 1. | "Lax" | 3:15 |
| 2. | "Fire Flies" (feat. Hannah Ray) | 5:14 |
| 3. | "Chemistry" (with Kanchan Daniel) | 3:39 |
| 4. | "Duck Face" | 6:24 |
| 5. | "Forever" (feat. Chris Medina) | 4:31 |
| 6. | "In Time" (feat. Ramona Arena) | 4:39 |
| 7. | "Attention Hoe" (with MC Duro) | 5:51 |
| 8. | "How You Like Me Now" (feat. Krishna Kaul) | 3:35 |

=== Extended plays (EPs) ===
Title
Details
Track listing
Bombay Electric
- Released: 10 May 2018
- Label: Bombay Electric Collective

| No. | Title | Length |
|---|---|---|
| 1. | "Princess St." | 2:27 |
| 2. | "Pali" (feat. Avneet Khurmi) | 2:59 |
| 3. | "Awaz De" (feat. Avneet Khurmi) | 3:28 |

Notes from Therapy
- Released: 4 March 2022
- Label: Artist Originals

All music is composed by Lost Stories, Spitfire & KASYAP.

| No. | Title | Length |
|---|---|---|
| 1. | "Amar" | 1:31 |
| 2. | "Peace Of Mind" (feat. Yashraj) | 3:06 |
| 3. | "Sun is Down" | 2:18 |

=== Singles ===
| Year | Title | Album |
|---|---|---|
| 2009 | "False Promises" | Non-album singles |
| 2009 | "Starlight" (credited as Rishab vs. Prayag) | Non-album singles |
| 2009 | "Gone But Not Forgotten" | Opus Tertio (DJ Package 004) |
| 2010 | "Flight 447" | Non-album singles |
| 2010 | "Ashna" | Non-album singles |
| 2011 | "Roshni" (credited as Prayag & Rishab) | Non-album singles |
| 2011 | "The Purple Cow" | Non-album singles |
| 2011 | "All Good Things" | Non-album singles |
| 2017 | "Spread the Fire" (featuring Marc Wulf) | Non-album singles |
| 2017 | "Paradise" | Non-album singles |
| 2018 | "Faking It" (featuring Matthew Steeper) | Non-album singles |
| 2018 | "Reveal Yourself" | Non-album singles |
| 2018 | "Uncomplicated" (with Zaeden featuring Matthew Steeper) | Non-album singles |
| 2019 | "Mahi" (featuring Kavita Seth) | Non-album singles |
| 2019 | "Bombay Dreams" (with Kshmr featuring Kavita Seth) | Non-album singles |
| 2020 | "Mai Ni Meriye" (featuring Jonita Gandhi & Ashwin Adwani) | Non-album singles |
| 2020 | "Noor" (featuring Zaeden & Akanksha Bhandari) | |
| 2021 | "Mehndi Te Vavi" (featuring Jonita Gandhi) | |
| 2022 | "Ruh" (featuring somanshu, Nikhita Gandhi & Yashraj) | |

=== Remixes ===
| Year | Song | Original Artist(s) | Notes |
|---|---|---|---|
| 2009 | "Stay In My Dream" | Elsa Hill | —N/a |
| 2009 | "Menkayo" | Mr. Sam (featuring T4L) | —N/a |
| 2009 | "My Blood" | Ashley Wallbridge (featuring Meighan Nealon) | —N/a |
| 2009 | "Falling" | Andy Duguid (featuring Julie Thompson) | —N/a |
| 2009 | "Thoughts" | Dave Schiemann | —N/a |
| 2009 | "Stadium Four" | Andy Moor vs. Lange | —N/a |
| 2009 | "Starlight" | Lost Stories (credited as Rishab vs. Prayag) | —N/a |
| 2010 | "These Are My People" | Johan Gielen | Credited as This Is Lost Stories Remix |
| 2010 | "Perfect Dream" | San (featuring Jan Johnston) | —N/a |
| 2010 | "Dark Heart Waiting" | Markus Schulz (featuring Khaz) | —N/a |
| 2010 | "With Me" | DJ Observer and Daniel Heatcliffe (featuring Hannah Ray) | —N/a |
| 2010 | "Ashna" | Lost Stories (credited as Prayag & Rishab) | —N/a |
| 2010 | "Amazon Chant" | Airscape | —N/a |
| 2010 | "The Emergency" | BT and Andrew Bayer | —N/a |
| 2010 | "Point The Finger" | Nadia Ali | —N/a |
| 2010 | "Spinning Around" | Mark Pledger and Rake (featuring Sabrina) | —N/a |
| 2011 | "Freak" | Foylee and X-Vertigo | —N/a |
| 2011 | "I'm Alone" | Sun Decade | —N/a |
| 2011 | "Sunrise Confessions" | Rene Ablaze and Melle Bakker | —N/a |
| 2011 | "All Good Things" | Lost Stories | Credited as Prayag & Rishab Intro Mix |
| 2013 | "The Spark" | Afrojack (featuring Spree Wilson) | —N/a |
| 2014 | "Thank You" | Dido | Posted on SoundCloud |
| 2014 | "Faded" | Zhu | Posted on SoundCloud |
| 2015 | "Yaar-E-Manbaya" | Kavita Seth | Posted on SoundCloud |
| 2016 | "Carnival of Rust" | Poets of the Fall | —N/a |
| 2016 | "Hymn for the Weekend" | Coldplay | —N/a |
| 2016 | "Sorry" | Justin Bieber | Cover performed with Armaan Malik, posted on SoundCloud |
| 2016 | "Faded" | Alan Walker | —N/a |
| 2016 | "Let Me Hold You (Turn Me On)" | Cheat Codes and Dante Klein | Collaborative remix with Crossnaders |
| 2016 | "Wherever I Go" | OneRepublic | —N/a |
| 2016 | "Kids" | OneRepublic | —N/a |
| 2017 | "Alone" | Alan Walker | Posted on SoundCloud |
| 2017 | "Feeling Different" | Makasi (featuring Elle Vee) | —N/a |
| 2020 | "Control" | Armaan Malik | —N/a |
| 2020 | "Heer Ranjha" | Bhuvan Bam | —N/a |
| 2020 | "OK Not to Be OK" | Marshmello and Demi Lovato | —N/a |

=== Films ===
- Do Aur Do Pyaar (2024)

=== As solo artists ===
==== Prayag Mehta ====
2009

" (credited as Prayag)
