= Locking Up the Sun =

Single by Poets of the Fall

from the album Carnival of Rust
- Released: 29 November 2006 (Finland)
- Genre: Alternative rock
- Length: 3:53
- Label: Insomniac; Playground
- Songwriters: Markus Kaarlonen, Marko Saaresto and Olli Tukiainen.
- Producer: Poets of the Fall

Poets of the Fall singles chronology
"Sorry Go 'Round" (2006)	"Locking Up the Sun" (2006)	"The Ultimate Fling" (2008)

"Locking Up the Sun" is the fourth track of the album Carnival of Rust by the Finnish rock band Poets of the Fall. A single version of the song was released in Finland on 29 November 2006. It includes the title track, a remix entitled "The Absolution" done by Captain and the music video directed by Tuomas "stObe" Harju, who shot two of the band's previous clips, as well. The video started to be aired on Finnish television stations at the beginning of November 2006. The single peaked at number three in the official Finnish single charts.

== Track listing ==
1. "Locking Up the Sun" (album version) (03:57)
2. "The Absolution" (Locking Up the Sun Remix) (04:54)

Bonus: Locking Up the Sun music video

== Nominations ==
Year	Award	Title	Rank
2006	The Voice	Best Music Video 2006	12th

== Charts ==
Chart (2006)	Peak position
Finnish Singles Chart	3
