= Lift (Poets of the Fall song) =

Single by Poets of the Fall

from the album Signs of Life
- B-side: The Beautiful Ones
- Released: 9 September 2004
- Genre: Alternative rock, post grunge
- Length: 5:13
- Label: Insomniac
- Songwriter(s): Markus Kaarlonen, Marko Saaresto, Olli Tukiainen

Poets of the Fall singles chronology
"Late Goodbye" (2004)	"Lift" (2004)	"Carnival of Rust" (2006)

"Lift" is a song by the Finnish rock band Poets of the Fall. It is the second single released from their debut album, Signs of Life. The song reached #8 on the Finnish Top 40 and stayed there for 11 consecutive weeks.

== Release ==
The song was released in Finland on 9 September 2004. The single contains two versions of the track, as well as non-album B-side "The Beautiful Ones".

Markus Kaarlonen produced a dance remix of the song, entitled Lift (Dramadance Remix). It was only available for download (as an MP3 or WAV file) on a secret page of the band's official website which could be accessed by the special login and password from the Signs of Life album booklet.

On 21 January 2011, the song was released on Rock Band Network.

== Track listing ==
1. "Lift" (radio edit) – 4:01
2. "Lift" (album version) – 5:13
3. "The Beautiful Ones" – 5:22

== Nominations ==
Year	Award	Title	Rank
2004	YleX's "Best of 2004"	Best Finnish song	2nd
2005	The Voice	Top 105	10th

== Music video ==
The promotional video for "Lift" was released on 8 August 2005. It can be watched online on the band's official website.
