= Lekar Hum Deewana Dil =

2014 Indian romantic drama film

- Official poster
- Directed by: Arif Ali
- Written by: Arif Ali
- Produced by: Dinesh Vijan; Saif Ali Khan
- Starring: Armaan Jain; Deeksha Seth
- Cinematography: Laxman Utekar
- Edited by: Shan Mohammed
- Music by: A. R. Rahman
- Production companies: Eros International; Maddock Films; Illuminati Films
- Distributed by: Eros International
- Release date: 4 July 2014
- Running time: 140 minutes
- Country: India
- Language: Hindi
- Budget: ₹16 crore

Lekar Hum Deewana Dil (transl. "Taking along our crazy hearts" or "with a passionate heart") is a 2014 Indian Hindi-language romantic drama film that stars Armaan Jain and Deeksha Seth. Jointly produced by Saif Ali Khan, Dinesh Vijan and Sunil Lulla under the banner of Eros International, Maddock Films and Illuminati Films, it is the debut directorial venture of Arif Ali, who was the assistant writer of the film Aahista Aahista, written by his brother Imtiaz Ali. A. R. Rahman composed the music. The film was released on 4 July 2014. The film received negative reviews from critics and was a box office failure.

== Plot summary ==
Dinesh (Dino) and Karishma (K) are best friends. Everyone in their circle of friends feels that they are perfect for each other, but Dino and Karishma ignore them and think of each other only as best friends. But when Karishma's father forces her into an arranged marriage with Mahesh, an employee from his office, both of them realize that they are perfect for each other and decide to elope. Before leaving, they adopt a stray puppy whom they name Jerry. They start their journey with little to no problems.

However, their parents start searching for them. This causes many problems for them. They first go to Goa, where they just manage to escape from Dino's brother and Mahesh. Before traveling to Nagpur, they decide to marry without considering the fact that Dino is only 20 years old. While attempting to escape from the police, they get lost in a jungle, where they start arguing and blaming each other. During that argument, they lose Jerry.

They decide to part ways and return home. When they reach home, they are scolded by their parents. Dino starts afresh and reconciles with his old friends, while Karishma decides to continue with the arranged marriage with Mahesh. Dino and Karishma decide to meet one last time before their divorce is finalised, when they realise they are still in love but decide to get divorced anyway. Dino starts working hard at his career and finds out from his friend that Karishma is getting married. While on the road to the airport, he realises that he and Karishma are made for each other.

He sneaks into the wedding while Karishma is getting ready for the wedding. He gives her a puppy named Tom, and they confess their love in front of everyone. Their parents also agree to let them be together and they leave on the bike with Tom.

== Cast ==
- Armaan Jain as Dinesh "Dino" Nigam
- Deeksha Seth as Karishma Shetty
- Sudeep Sahir as Dev Nigam
- Kumud Mishra as Pradeep Nigam
- Anita Kulkarni as Meena Nigam
- Rahul Shetty as Dhananjay Shetty
- Rinku Karmarkar as Mridula Shetty
- Neha Mahajan as Seema
- Akhil Iyer as Mahesh Khandelwal
- Rohini Hattangadi as Judge
- Gautami Kapoor as The Marriage Counselor
- Varun Badola as Chacha
- Nishikant Dixit as Film Producer
- Nikita Dutta as Rose
- Prabuddha Dayama
- Darius Shroff as Dino's Lawyer
- Jaywant Wadkar as Karishma's Lawyer
- Shravan Mehta
- Zuber K. Khan
- Dilip Kumar Kuldeep as Hotel Manager
- Radhika Bangia as a Dancer Girl

== Production ==
=== Development ===
In 2013, reports emerged that director Imtiaz Ali's brother Arif Ali was about to make a directorial debut love story. By October 2013, Saif Ali Khan through his official press release confirmed, "For starters, I am co-producing a film with Armaan Jain. It is being directed by Imtiaz Ali's brother Arif Ali." Later on inclusion of A. R. Rahman for the film's music, producer Dinesh Vijan quoted, "We are excited about our collaboration with A R Rahman too. He has created a young and new sound, which is unlike anything we have heard before." The film was untitled for over six months prior to official announcements though there were several rounds of discussions amongst the team, suggesting title as Dekho Magar Pyaar Se Later it was director Karan Johar who came up with title Lekar Hum Deewana Dil, apparently, the chart-busting track of the same name from Nasir Hussain's 1973 film Yaadon Ki Baaraat. In an interview with Press Trust of India the lead actor quoted, "I gave the audition for 'Lekar Hum Deewana Dil' without telling any one in the family. When Arif sir selected me for the film, I called up didi (Kareena Kapoor) and broke the news to her that I am the next actor of their production." On their roles, Armaan stated, "My character 'Dino' is someone who loves thrill, adventure full of energy and full of life. He is someone who does things without really thinking about it. He does thing and then things about it or probably doesn't even think. So I think the crust of the character is that at some point in time we have always done things without thinking and often it can be a problem, you can make lot of mistakes. So just that carefree attitude, that energy is something I use to have when I was 17 so playing this character just took me back to when I was 17 years. So yeah it's just a lively character." Further, Deeksha noted that the film is realistic. Her character had less or no make up with simple hairstyles and costumes. She had kept her dialogue delivery normal without any filmy touches. A notable aspect, she added that the film warrants that the girl is not garish while the boy doesn't start showing off his abs. In an interview with The Times of India, actress Nikita Dutta who plays a supporting role in the film said she perceives her character as 'a sweet and smart girl'. She is paired opposite Sudeep Sahir in the film.

=== Filming ===
The film was shot with majority of filming in Mumbai. Officially, the shooting began in May 2013. By September 2013, an estimate forty percent of the filming was completed in Mumbai itself. The next schedule of filming began in the same city. Certain filming took place in Chhattisgarh (wherein one of the longest scenes was shot), Ooty and Chennai. Filming was completed by February 2014. Choreographer Rahul Dev Shetty marks his Bollywood debut through this film. Dubbing works of the film were carried out at B. R. Studios in Mumbai.

== Marketing ==
The first looks of the lead actors were revealed on 7 May 2014. The theatrical trailer was released on 9 May 2014. It was listed in 2014 May month's week top Youtube video in India. The video teaser of "Khalifa" sung by A. R. Rahman was released on 28 May 2014 and the teaser of song "Maaloom" was released on 5 June 2014. The first dialogue promo was released on 23 June 2014.

In June 2014, the film was promoted by the lead actors, appearing at television shows-Comedy Nights with Kapil, Jhalak Dikhhla Jaa Fifth season of Entertainment Ke Liye Kuch Bhi Karega, Further promotions happened in Mumbai Metro, 92.7 BIG FM, 94.3 My FM, Pink City market and Jal Mahal in Jaipur, Agora mall, LDRP Institute of Technology and Research in Ahmedabad, airing promotions through Red FM 93.5 in Hyderabad, Presidency College in Bengaluru. On 2 July 2014 the lead pair promoted the film in New Delhi. Taking a cue from their film which shows the lead actress adopting a stray puppy, the makers of the film initiated a 'Adopt a Dog, Be a Hero Campaign' to raise awareness about animal welfare. On this the female lead of the film quoted, "Actually even in the movie my character 'Karishma' adopts a who is a very integral part in the movie and wherever Dino and Karishma go, the dog is with them. So because we felt so strongly towards it and we just felt that this is something we should spread and people should do it because we have a lot of strays in our country."

== Music ==
A. R. Rahman has composed six songs for the film. The film has songs fitting several moods of the characters and covering different genres. Singer-turned-composer Hriday Gattani made his Bollywood debut as singer with this film. The tracks "Khalifa" and "Maaloom" were released as singles. The album was digitally released on 13 June 2014 by the record label Eros Music. A special musical concert was held on 27 June 2014 at JW Marriott Hotel in Mumbai. The concert had A. R. Rahman playing the piano to the vocal performance of singers on their respective songs of the soundtrack. The event was presided by Imtiaz Ali, Karan Johar, Amit Sadh, Anaita Shroff Adajania, Kapoor family—notably Karisma Kapoor, Kareena Kapoor, Rishi Kapoor, Neetu Singh, Randhir Kapoor, Babita apart from the main crew of the film.

The soundtrack album received mixed to positive critical reception upon release.

== Reception ==
=== Critical response ===
==== India ====
Critic Blessy Chettiar for Deccan Chronicle assigned a score of 2 on 5 and called it a mediocre entertaining film and a mixture of Imtiaz Ali's former work(s), stating, "In short, LHDD (Lekar Hum Deewana Dil) is Love Aaj Kal, Jab photographer (We) Met Rockstar, and set out on a Highway, landing in a Cocktail of sorts. Watch it only if you've exhausted all other movie options." Rajeev Masand for CNN-IBN gave the film 1.5 stars out of 5, calling it a tad boring one and said, "Lekar Hum Deewana Dil isn't even a satisfying rom-com about squabbling lovers. The humor is consistently juvenile, the climax so obvious you've guessed it long before it arrives, and the dialogue phoney despite being peppered with modern-day slang." At Mumbai Mirror, Saumil Gandhi awarded the film 1.5 stars (out of 5) and stated, "Deeksha Seth shows some spark, but it requires a better film than this to judge her. Both she and Armaan are undone by some poor writing and direction, and that is indeed unfortunate. While all's well that end's well for their characters, we would be hard pressed to say the same for the film itself." At Hindustan Times where the film received 1 star out of 5, Soumya Srivastava called the film an 'epic failure', 'intolerable', 'downright torturous' and gave the bottom line, "One dialogue from the film sums it up aptly for us: "yaar ye toh epic fail hogaya!" Watch it only if your life depends on it." Rohit Khilnani of Headlines Today gave the film 1 star out of 5 and reviewed the main aspects of the film as, "Armaan Jain is too young to face the camera and entertain the audience on the big screen and to hit the right chord, he should wait till he is offered the perfect script that suits his age. The female lead, Deeskha has a good screen presence but has little scope since the writing doesn't give her much potential to show any talent. A. R. Rahman's music is not as melodious and below average just like the film. Director Arif Ali fails to entertain through this stale formula with appalling direction." Anindita Dev for Zee News wrote, "Young Armaan seems to have made a bad choice for a debut and has a lot to learn before the audience takes him seriously. Arif Ali's debut is nothing short of a huge letdown. The movie is not worth wasting money on as neither the story-line not the characters are entertaining. At Koimoi, critic Manohar Basu gave the film 1 out of 5 stars and felt, "Lekar Hum Deewana Dil is a bad film which is quite a blemish on romantic comedies. Neither romantic nor funny from any angle, it is an awfully boring film." Shubhra Gupta for The Indian Express gave a score of 0.5 (out of 5) and noted, "Deeksha has little more promise than Armaan Jain". Anuj Kumar for The Hindu called the film "a dreary escapist fare—Strictly for the cool and the confused ones." At the India-West critic R. M. Vijayakar gave a headline, "This Silly Tale Is a Waste of Young Talent." He criticised the technical aspects and added, "We feel sorry for these two talents who needed better starts, and sincerely hope that they will be able to live this movie down." Subha Shetty for Mid-Day wrote, "As you go through this 140 plus minutes of love saga, which gets increasingly irritating, you stop caring if they are together or not, because going by the storyline, it seemed like they didn't care either. Jain makes a strictly decent debut, he definitely needs a lot more grooming while Deeksha seems to have the potential though this was not the platform to judge her talent.

Nishi Tiwari of Rediff called the film 'A bit of mess' and summarised, "Lekar Hum Deewana Dil would have done much better for itself had it tried to find its original voice, instead of pandering to a vague idea of what sells when it comes to love stories." She gave the film 2.5 stars out of 5. Madhureeta Mukherjee for The Economic Times assigned 2.5 stars out of 5, "The chemistry between the two is affable, but the daily bickering that is cutesy at start, becomes repetitive. Also, the story is far from unique. On the contrary, Taran Adarsh for Bollywood Hungama felt, "On the whole, LEKAR HUM DEEWANA DIL has several wonderful moments and genuine sparks that stay with you. The film should appeal to its target audience – the youth."

==== Overseas ====
Naheed Israr for the newspaper Dawn wrote, "Lekar Hum Deewana Dil is purely for entertainment – so don't expect more from it. The story may be traditional, but it doesn't let you get bored." Mumtaz Khusro for News on Sunday stated that Lekar Hum Deewana Dil wasn't a patch on either of the excellent movies like Saathiya or Jaane Tu... Ya Jaane Na and thus, she called the film a bit of embarrassing and rated it 1.5 on 5. Anupriya Kumar for Reuters wrote, "It is an insipid disaster. Go for "Lekar Hum Deewana Dil" if clichéd plots, bad acting and occasional bursts of actual fun do the trick for you. Director Arif Ali's Lekar Hum Deewana Dil will try your patience from the word go." Sneha May Francis of Emirates 24/7 stated, "While the new star kid (Armaan Jain) on the block is sincere, his romance appears like a bizarre mix of old Bollywood love stories. At two hours and twenty minutes, Arif's predictable love story is a drag, and definitely not the finest."
