= Revolution Roulette =

Studio album by Poets of the Fall
- Released: 26 March 2008
- Genre: Alternative rock, hard rock
- Length: 51:06
- Label: Insomniac
- Producer: Poets of the Fall

Poets of the Fall chronology
| Carnival of Rust (2006) | Revolution Roulette (2008) | Twilight Theater (2010) |

Singles from Revolution Roulette
- 1. "The Ultimate Fling" Released: 6 February 2008; 2. "Diamonds for Tears" Released: 21 May 2008

Professional ratings
Review scores
| Source | Rating |
|---|---|
| "Tempelores.com" | favourable |
| "Venia-mag.net" | 95/100 |
| "Sputnikmusic.com" | 4/5 |

Revolution Roulette is the third album by the Finnish rock band Poets of the Fall. It was released in Finland on 26 March 2008 and went straight to the top of the Finnish charts. It was certified gold by IFPI Finland two weeks after being released.

Since 12 April 2008, the album is available for worldwide purchase via the iTunes Store.

== Track listing ==
All tracks are written by Markus Kaarlonen, Marko Saaresto and Olli Tukiainen

| No. | Title | Length |
|---|---|---|
| 1. | "More" | 4:01 |
| 2. | "The Ultimate Fling" | 6:55 |
| 3. | "Revolution Roulette" | 6:17 |
| 4. | "Psychosis" | 4:23 |
| 5. | "Fragile" | 4:08 |
| 6. | "Clevermind" | 3:38 |
| 7. | "Miss Impossible" | 3:52 |
| 8. | "Diamonds for Tears" | 4:07 |
| 9. | "Passion Colors Everything" | 3:51 |
| 10. | "Save Me" | 3:31 |
| 11. | "Where Do We Draw the Line" | 5:09 |

== Release history ==
| Country | Release date |
|---|---|
| iTunes worldwide | 26 March 2008 |

== Singles ==
| Single | Release date | Charts |
|---|---|---|
| The Ultimate Fling | 6 February 2008 (Finland) | 2 |
| Diamonds for Tears | 21 May 2008 (Finland) | 13 |
