= Sorry Go 'Round =

Single by Poets of the Fall

from the album Carnival of Rust
- Released: 16 August 2006 (Finland)
- Genre: Alternative Rock
- Length: 3:38
- Label: Insomniac; Playground
- Songwriters: Markus Kaarlonen, Marko Saaresto and Olli Tukiainen.

Poets of the Fall singles chronology
"Carnival of Rust" (2006)	"Sorry Go 'Round" (2006)	"Locking Up The Sun" (2006)

"Sorry Go 'Round" is a limited-edition single by the Finnish rock band Poets of the Fall with a special, black lacquered cover. Every copy has a unique number. It features two versions of the track, which have been remastered in comparison to the full album's version. The band also planned to include a remix of the song, but this idea has been abandoned. It is unknown if the remix was completed or if it will ever be released. Additionally, no music video has been made to promote the single. The single's release was originally planned on 26 July 2006 but was delayed to 16 August 2006 due to the popularity of the previous single, Carnival of Rust. The single peaked at number seven in the official Finnish singles chart.

== Track listing ==
No.	Title	Length
1.	"Sorry Go 'Round" (Radio Edit)	3:24
2.	""Sorry Go 'Round"" (Album Version)	3:40

== Charts ==
Chart (2006)	Peak position
Finnish Singles Chart	7
