= Piyal =

Piyal is a given name. Notable people with the name include:

- Piyal Abeysekera, Sri Lankan army general
- Piyal Bhattacharya, Indian theatre director
- Piyal De Silva, Sri Lankan naval officer
- Piyal Wijetunge (born 1971), Sri Lankan cricketer
- Piyal Nishantha de Silva (born 1970), Sri Lankan politician
- Ahsan Tanvir Piyal, Main vocalist of Bangladeshi band "Odd Signature"
