= Hriday Gattani =

- Born: 20 January 1991 (age 35); Mumbai, India
- Occupations: Singer; Composer
- Years active: 2014–present
- Musical career
- Genres: Pop; filmi; classical
- Instruments: Vocals, Guitar & Piano

Hriday Deepak Gattani (born 20 January 1991) is an Indian playback singer, music director, songwriter and performer from Mumbai, India.

== Personal life ==
Hriday Gattani was born and brought up in Mumbai. His father Deepak Gattani has officially managed many music concerts and live performances for music director A. R. Rahman.

Hriday Gattani grew up watching great artists perform live and was surrounded by musicians in his formative years because of his father's career in music management.

== Career ==
Hriday was mentored by the legendary Music Maestro A. R. Rahman. Under Rahman's music direction, Hriday made his Bollywood debut as a singer in the 2014 film Lekar Hum Deewana Dil, with the songs 'Maaloom' and 'Tu Shining'.

Apart from touring with A. R. Rahman for live concerts and performances, Hriday has also recorded for A. R. Rahman's 'One Vision', a song composed from prose written by then President, Dr A. P. J. Abdul Kalam. Hriday recorded an upbeat indie pop track "I Just Met Somebody" in collaboration with Singer Neeti Mohan. Neeti sang the Hindi verses of the song while Gattani sang the English ones. He Collaborated with Shruti Pathak on the Fusion cover ‘Nothing on You' and with Suchismita Das on ‘Let It Be'. As per the Singer, his Single 'Uljha' in collaboration with Vishal Dadlani's label VLT (Vishal Likes This), is based on his personal experiences.

Hriday debuted as a full fledged Music Director with a Marathi movie "Youngraad".

== Discography ==
- "Tu Shining" — Lekar Hum Deewana Dil (2014)
- "Maaloom" — Lekar Hum Deewana Dil (2014)
- "Khalifa" — Lekar Hum Deewana Dil (2014)
- "I Just Met Somebody" — (2014)
- "Tango Kalalo" — Kaatru Veliyidai (2017)
- "Piya Basanti" — (2015)
- "Prema Swaramulalo" — 24 (2016, Dubbed version)
- "My Twin Brother" — 24 (2016, Dubbed version)
- "Udan Choo" — Banjo (2016)
- "Uljha" — (2016)
- "Sakhi Saheli" — (2017)
- "Over You" — (2017)
- "Sun Re Sajna" — (2017)
- "Maskhari" - Dil Bechara (2020)
- "Main Tumhara" - Dil Bechara (2020)
- "Ayalaa Ayalaa" - Ayalaan (2023)
- "Gull Ainaa" - Retro (film) - (D) (2025)
