= Priti Menon =

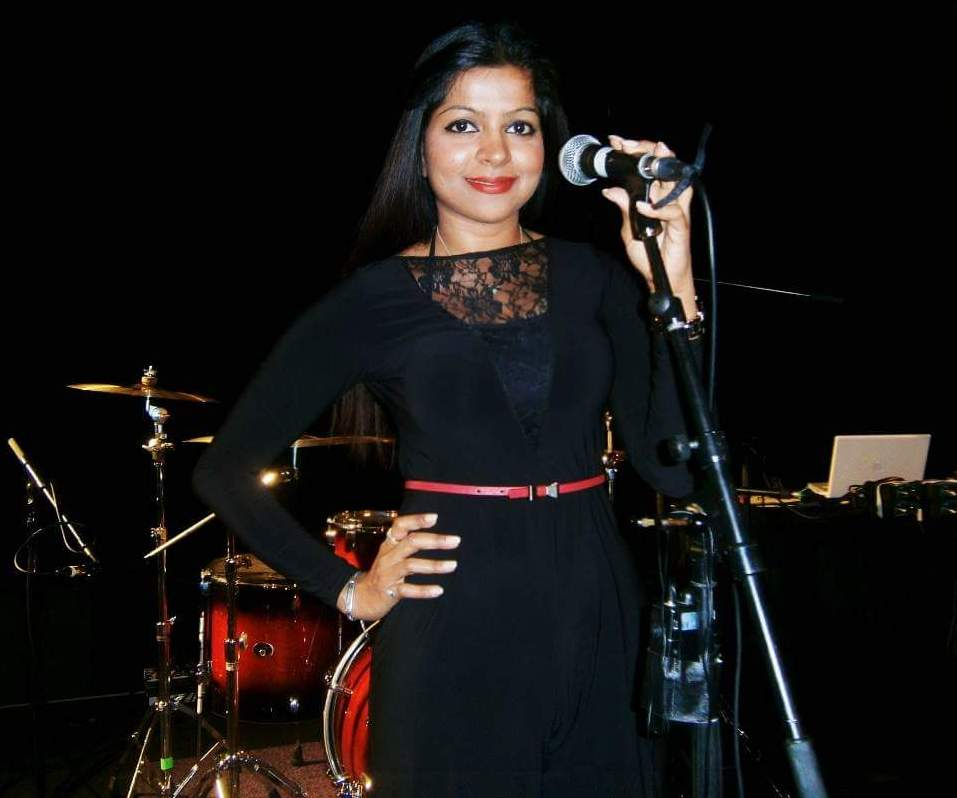
- Glasgow Commonwealth Performance

Background information
- Born: Priti Surendran; Bombay, India
- Origin: Kerala
- Genre: Carnatic music
- Occupations: Singer, psychologist, model
- Instrument: Vocals
- Years active: 2012–present
- Website: http://pritimenon.uk

Priti Surendran, often credited as Priti Menon, is an Indian trained singer in Carnatic music, currently living at London, England. Priti Menon started her musical career in the UK by winning the Zee TV Sa Re Ga Ma Pa Online Talent Hunt in 2010.

She performed at the Glasgow New music biennial, alongside the Common Wealth Games in 2014. The New Music Biennial is an international celebration – part of Glasgow Culture 2014, the cultural programme of the Commonwealth Games. Priti performed his new piece "You Run on Tracks, Not Roads". It takes verbatim quotes from outspoken nationalist leaders such as Narendra Modi, Idi Amin, and subverts them into musical form.

== Discography ==
=== Songs ===
- "Chupke Se"
- "Tujhe Maan loon"
- "Khabida"
- "Om Namah Shivaya" (bhajan)

feat. (Covers)

- "Teri Meri" Remix
- "Hai Rama – Charles Bosco Remix " Remix
- "Nenjukkule – The Cover"
- "Soniye Hiriye (Studio Unplugged)"
- "Paani da rang (BeAsian)"
