= One Heart (film) =

Indian concert film

- Official Poster
- Directed by: YM Movies Team
- Produced by: YM Movies; Saira Rahman; Grape Ventures Pvt. Ltd.
- Edited by: Nasreen Munni Kabir; Amith Krishnan
- Production companies: YM Movies; Grape Ventures Pvt. Ltd.
- Distributed by: Sunshine Studios
- Release date: 8 September 2017
- Running time: 87 minutes
- Country: India
- Languages: Hindi; English; Tamil

One Heart (2017) is India's first concert film about A. R. Rahman and his music, directed by YM Movies Team. Nazeef Mohammad was the show director of the film, while additional arrangements and music direction was handled by Ranjit Barot respectively.

== Cast ==
- A. R. Rahman - Main Performer/Composer/Main character of the film.
- Ann Marie Calhoun
- Annette Philip
- Ashwin Srinivasan
- Haricharan Seshadri
- Jonita Gandhi
- karthick devaraj
- Keba Jeremiah
- Mohini Dey
- Sanket Athale
- Shiraz Uppal
- Ranjit Baroot

== Critical reception ==
Sudhir Srinivasan from The New Indian Express said, "As he sings Mahi Ve and sees the love in the eyes of every member of the audience, his eyes almost well up. These little, precious moments, if you care enough to look, add a lot of value to the film." and more he rated it 3/5. Srinivasa Ramanujam from The Hindu said, "For those who've never gone to a concert, One Heart is ideal – it gives you a sense of the atmosphere and sounds. And for those who have, it gives them a chance to undergo a musically-rich experience minus the constant cheering and varied distractions." and more.
