= Carnival of Rust =

Studio album by Poets of the Fall
- Released: 12 April 2006
- Genre: Alternative rock; post-grunge
- Length: 48:26
- Label: Insomniac
- Producer: Poets of the Fall

Poets of the Fall chronology
Signs of Life (2005)	Carnival of Rust (2006)	Revolution Roulette (2008)

Singles from Carnival of Rust
- 1. "Carnival of Rust" Released: 22 March 2006; 2. "Sorry Go 'Round" Released: 16 August 2006; 3. "Locking Up the Sun" Released: 29 November 2006

Professional ratings
Review scores
Source	Rating

Carnival of Rust is the second album by the Finnish rock band Poets of the Fall. It was released on 12 April 2006 in Finland, 12 September 2006 in Sweden, October 2006 in Australia, Russia and Ukraine, then on 20 April 2007 in Germany. The album went straight to the top of the Finnish Top 40 album chart and stayed inside the Top 40 for 26 weeks.

The album went straight to the top on Finnish radio channel YleX due to fan votes and was recognized as "Album of the Week" after remaining number one for three weeks straight. It was certified gold in Finland three weeks after being released and has sold platinum. On 17 December 2006 it was announced that the album is featured in Helsingin Sanomat's "Best albums of 2006" article.

== Track listing ==
All tracks are written by Markus Kaarlonen, Marko Saaresto and Olli Tukiainen.

No.	Title	Length
1.	"Fire"	3:59
2.	"Sorry Go 'Round"	3:35
3.	"Carnival of Rust"	4:20
4.	"Locking Up the Sun"	3:58
5.	"Gravity"	3:55
6.	"King of Fools"	4:07
7.	"Roses"	3:51
8.	"Desire"	4:10
9.	"All the Way / 4U"	4:08
10.	"Delicious"	3:54
11.	"Maybe Tomorrow Is a Better Day"	4:44
12.	"Dawn"	3:28

== Release history ==
Country	Release date
Finland	12 April 2006
Sweden	12 September 2006
Australia	October 2006
Russia	October 2006
Ukraine	October 2006
Germany	20 April 2007
iTunes worldwide	12 April 2008

=== Singles ===
Single	Release dates	Charts
Single	Release dates	Finland
Carnival of Rust*	22 March 2006 (Finland) 1 December 2006 (Germany)	2
Sorry Go 'Round	16 August 2006 (Finland)	7
Locking Up the Sun*	29 November 2006 (Finland)	3

== Awards ==
Year	Award	Title	Result
2006	NRJ Radio Awards	Best Finnish Album	Nominated
2007	Emma Awards	Best Rock Album	Nominated
