= Lakshmi Manmohan =

Indian playback singer

Lakshmi Manmohan is an Indian playback singer who predominantly works in Kannada movie industry.

== Discography ==
Song	Film	Music	Lyrics	Co-singer/s	Language	Notes
Ee Touchali Eno Ide	Dhumm	Gurukiran	V. Nagendra Prasad		Kannada	
Ee Kanninalli	Just Maath Maathalli	Raghu Dixit	Nandish Chandra	Raghu Dixit	Kannada	
Ello Ello (Female)	Shishira (film)	B. Ajaneesh Loknath	Manju swaraj K R		Kannada	
Geleyane	Kempegowda	Arjun Janya	V. Nagendra Prasad	Naresh Iyer	Kannada	
Gollaya Gollaya	Kempa				Kannada	
Hani Hani	Gandhi Smiles		Krish Joshi	Sadhana Sargam, Veer Samrth	Kannada	
Hrudayave Bayaside Ninnane	Krishnan Love Story	V. Sridhar	Jayanth Kaikini	Sonu Nigam	Kannada	
Nannolave Olave	Pulikeshi	-----	Chandan S. P	Nakul	Kannada	
Parijatada	Krishnan Marriage Story	Sridhar V. Sambhram	Jayanth Kaikini	Rajesh Krishnan	Kannada	
Sakha Sakha	Jackpot (2006 film)	Hameed	Ramnarayan	Rajesh Krishnan	Kannada	
Thangali Eli Baa	Minchina Ota (2008 film)					

== Awards and honours ==
She won Karnataka State Film Award for Best Female Playback Singer for Gandhi Smile in 2010–11.
