= 59th Filmfare Awards South =

Award ceremony for South Indian films

- Date: 7 July 2012
- Hosted by: Karthik; Chinmayi
- Produced by: Idea Cellular
- Official website: Jawaharlal Nehru Stadium, Chennai, Tamil Nadu, India

Highlights
- Best Picture: Olave Mandhara (Kannada); Traffic (Malayalam); Aadukalam (Tamil); Dookudu (Telugu)
- Most awards: Dookudu (6; Telugu)
- Most nominations: Dookudu (10; Telugu)

The 59th Filmfare Awards South ceremony, honouring the winners and nominees of the best of South Indian cinema in 2011, was held on 7 July 2012 at the Jawaharlal Nehru Stadium, Chennai, India. More than 451 films from each of the four film industries were considered for nomination in various categories.

== Awards and nominees ==
=== Main awards ===
The winners are listed first and highlighted in boldface.

==== Kannada cinema ====
Best Film	Best Director
**Olave Mandhara**; Bettada Jeeva; Kempe Gowda; Lifu Ishtene; Puttakkana Highway	**Jayathirtha – Olave Mandhara**; Dinakar Thoogudeepa – Saarathi; Pawan Kumar – Lifu Ishtene; P. Kumar – Vishnuvardhana; P. Sheshadri – Bettada Jeeva
Best Actor	Best Actress
**Puneeth Rajkumar – Hudugaru**; Ajay Rao – Krishnan Marriage Story; Darshan – Saarathi; Srinagar Kitty – Sanju Weds Geetha; Sudeepa – Kempe Gowda	**Ramya – Sanju Weds Geetha**; Deepa Sannidhi – Paramathma; Nidhi Subbaiah – Krishnan Marriage Story; Radhika Pandit – Hudugaru; Ragini Dwivedi – Kempe Gowda
Best Supporting Actor	Best Supporting Actress
**P. Ravi Shankar – Kempegowda**; H. G. Dattatreya – Bettada Jeeva; Rangayana Raghu – Olave Mandhara; Sharath Lohitashwa – Saarathi; Yogesh – Hudugaru	**Shruti – Puttakkana Highway**; Abhinaya – Hudugaru; Aindrita Ray – Paramathma; Ramya Barna – Hudugaru; Veena Sundar – Olave Mandhara
Best Music Director	Best Lyricist
**Jessie Gift – Sanju Weds Geetha**; Mano Murthy – Lifu Ishtene; V. Harikrishna – Paramathma; V. Harikrishna – Hudugaru; V. Sridhar – Krishnan Marriage Story	**Kaviraj – "Sanju Mattu Geetha" in Sanju Weds Geetha**; Jayanth Kaikini – "Paravasha Naadenu" in Paramathma; Kaviraj – "Gaganave Baagi" in Sanju Weds Geetha; V. Nagendra Prasad – "Yen Chandane Hudugi" in Hudugaru; V. Nagendra Prasad – "Haago Heege" in Saarathi
Best Playback Singer - Male	Best Playback Singer - Female
**Chethan Sosca – "Yaarige Healona" in Lifu Ishtene**; Rajesh Krishnan – "Parijathada" in Krishnan Marriage Story; Sonu Nigam – "Paravasha Naadenu" in Paramathma; Sonu Nigam – "Neerinalli Sanna Ale" in Hudugaru; V. Harikrishna – "Kathlalli Karadige" in Paramathma	**Shreya Ghoshal – "Gaganave Baagi" in Sanju Weds Geetha**; Lakshmi Manmohan – "Parijathada" in Krishnan Marriage Story; Shamita Malnad – "Neerige Baare Chenni" in Jarasandha; Shamita Malnad – "Manase Manase" in Saarathi; Shreya Ghoshal – "Maayavi Maayavi" in Lifeu Ishtene

==== Malayalam cinema ====
Best Film	Best Director
**Traffic**; Beautiful; Indian Rupee; Pranayam; Salt N' Pepper	**Blessy – Pranayam**; Aashiq Abu – Salt N' Pepper; Rajesh Pillai – Traffic; Renjith – Indian Rupee; Salim Ahamed – Adaminte Makan Abu
Best Actor	Best Actress
**Salim Kumar – Adaminte Makan Abu**; Anupam Kher – Pranayam; Mohanlal – Arabiyum Ottakavum P. Madhavan Nairum; Mohanlal – Pranayam; Prithviraj – Indian Rupee	**Kavya Madhavan – Khaddama**; Jaya Prada – Pranayam; Rima Kallingal – City of God; Samvrutha Sunil – Swapna Sanchari; Shwetha Menon – Salt N' Pepper
Best Supporting Actor	Best Supporting Actress
**Thilakan – Indian Rupee**; Anoop Menon – Beautiful; Baburaj – Salt N' Pepper; Fahadh Faasil – Chappa Kurish; Jagathi Sreekumar – Urumi	**Lena – Traffic**; Meghna Raj – Beautiful; Mythili – Salt N' Pepper; Nithya Menen – Urumi; Ramya Nambeeshan – Chappa Kurish
Best Music Director	Best Lyricist
**M. Jayachandran – Pranayam**; Bijibal – Salt N' Pepper; Deepak Dev – Urumi; M. K. Arjunan – Nayika; Ramesh Narayan – Makaramanju	**O. N. V. Kurup – "Paattil Ee Paattil" in Pranayam**; Anoop Menon – "Mazhaneer Thullikal" in Beautiful; Mullanezhi – "Ee Puzhayum" in Indian Rupee; Murugan Kattakada – "Madhumasa Mounaragam" in Rathinirvedam; Rafeeq Ahammed – "Chembavu" in Salt N' Pepper
Best Playback Singer - Male	Best Playback Singer - Female
**Vijay Yesudas – "Ee Puzhayum" in Indian Rupee**; Hariharan – "Amruthamayi Abhayamai" in Snehaveedu; P. Jayachandran – "Premikkumbol" in Salt N' Pepper; Srinivas – "Ithile Varoo" in The Train; Unni Menon – "Mazhaneer Thullikal" in Beautiful	**Shreya Ghoshal – "Paattil Ee Paattil" in Pranayam**; Gayatri – "Ninviral Thumbil" in Beautiful; Jyotsna – "Chantham Thikanjoru" in Mohabbath; Manjari – "Chimmi Chimmi" in Urumi; Shreya Ghoshal – "Kaanamullal" in Salt N' Pepper

==== Tamil cinema ====
Best Film	Best Director
**Aadukalam – Kathiresan**; 7 Aum Arivu – Udhayanidhi Stalin; Deiva Thirumagal – M. Chinthamani, Ronnie Screwvala; Ko – Kumar, Jayaraman; Mankatha – Dhayanidhi Alagiri, Vivek Rathnavel	**Vetrimaaran – Aadukalam**; A. L. Vijay – Deiva Thirumagal; A. R. Murugadoss – 7 Aum Arivu; K. V. Anand – Ko; Venkat Prabhu – Mankatha
Best Actor	Best Actress
**Dhanush – Aadukalam**; Ajith Kumar – Mankatha; Jiiva – Ko; Suriya – 7 Aum Arivu; Vikram – Deiva Thirumagal	**Anjali – Engaeyum Eppothum**; Asin Thottumkal – Kaavalan; Anushka Shetty – Deiva Thirumagal; Ineya – Vaagai Sooda Vaa; Richa Gangopadhyay – Mayakkam Enna; Shruthi Haasan – 7 Aum Arivu
Best Supporting Actor	Best Supporting Actress
**Ajmal Ameer – Ko**; Santhanam – Deiva Thirumagal; Santhanam – Siruthai; Sunder Ramu – Mayakkam Enna; V. I. S. Jayabalan – Aadukalam	**Ananya – Engaeyum Eppothum**; Amala Paul – Deiva Thirumagal; Lakshmi Rai – Mankatha; Manisha Koirala – Mappillai; Mithra Kurian – Kaavalan
Best Music Director	Best Lyricist
**G. V. Prakash Kumar – Aadukalam**; G. V. Prakash Kumar – Deiva Thirumagal; Harris Jayaraj – 7 Aum Arivu; Harris Jayaraj – Ko; M Ghibran – Vaagai Sooda Vaa	**Vairamuthu – "Saara Saara" from Vaagai Sooda Vaa**; Madhan Karky – "Nee Korinaal" from Nootrenbadhu; Na. Muthukumar – "Mun Andhi" from 7 Aum Arivu; Na. Muthukumar – "Vizhigalil Oru" from Deiva Thirumagal; Thamarai – "Engeyum Kadhal" from Engeyum Kadhal
Best Playback Singer - Male	Best Playback Singer - Female
**Aalap Raju – "Enamo Aedho" from Ko**; G. V. Prakash Kumar – "Yathe Yathe" from Aadukalam; Karthik – "Mun Andhi" from 7 Aum Arivu; Richard – "Nangai" from Engeyum Kadhal; S. P. Balasubrahmanyam – "Yamma Yamma" from 7 Aum Arivu	**Chinmayi – "Saara Saara" from Vaagai Sooda Vaa**; Madhushree – "Un Pere Theriyadhu" from Engaeyum Eppothum; Neha Bhasin – "Poranae" from Vaagai Sooda Vaa; Saindhavi – "Vizhigalil Oru" from Deiva Thirumagal; Swetha Mohan – "Nee Korinaal" from Nootrenbadhu

==== Telugu cinema ====
Best Film	Best Director
**Dookudu**; 100% Love; Mr. Perfect; Rajanna; Sri Rama Rajyam	**Sreenu Vaitla – Dookudu**; Bapu – Sri Rama Rajyam; Dasaradh – Mr. Perfect; Nandini Reddy – Ala Modalaindi; Sukumar – 100% Love
Best Actor	Best Actress
**Mahesh Babu – Dookudu**; Balakrishna – Sri Rama Rajyam; Nagarjuna – Rajanna; Prabhas – Mr. Perfect; Ram Pothineni – Kandireega	**Nayantara – Sri Rama Rajyam**; Kajal Aggarwal – Mr. Perfect; Nithya Menen – Ala Modalaindi; Samantha Ruth Prabhu – Dookudu; Tamannaah Bhatia – 100% Love
Best Supporting Actor	Best Supporting Actress
**M. S. Narayana – Dookudu**; Akkineni Nageswara Rao – Sri Rama Rajyam; Jagapati Babu – Jai Bolo Telangana; Prakash Raj – Dookudu; Sonu Sood – Kandireega	**Annie – Rajanna**; Aksha Pardasany – Kandireega; Lakshmi Manchu – Anaganaga O Dheerudu; Poonam Kaur – Gaganam; Taapsee Pannu – Mr. Perfect
Best Music Director	Best Lyricist
**Thaman – Dookudu**; Devi Sri Prasad – 100% Love; Ilaiyaraaja – Sri Rama Rajyam; Kalyani Malik – Ala Modalaindi; M. M. Keeravani – Rajanna	**Jonnavithhula Ramalingeswara Rao – "Jagadhannadha" in Sri Rama Rajyam**; Anantha Sreeram – "Chali Chali Ga" in Mr. Perfect; Ramajogayya Sastry – "Guruvaram March Okati" in Dookudu; Sirivennela Sitaramasastri – "Ammammo Ammo" in Ala Modalaindi; Suddala Ashok Teja – "Lachuvamma Lachuvamma" in Rajanna
Best Playback Singer - Male	Best Playback Singer - Female
**Rahul Nambiar – "Guruvaram March Okati" in Dookudu**; Karthik – "Champakamala" in Kandireega; Hemachandra – "Oka Vithanam" in Golconda High School; Tippu – "Kalaya Nijama" in Sri Rama Rajyam; Vijay Prakash – "Niharika" in Oosaravelli	**Shreya Ghoshal – "Jagadhananda Karaka" in Sri Rama Rajyam**; Swathi – "A Square B Square" in 100% Love; Neha Bhasin – "Hello Hello" in Dhada; Nithya Menen – "Ammammo Ammo" in Ala Modalaindi; Ramya – "Poovai Poovai" in Dookudu

=== Technical Awards ===
Best Choreography	Best Cinematography
**Prem Rakshith – "Nath Nath" from** **Badrinath**	**Velraj** – **Aadukalam**

=== Special awards ===
Lifetime Achievement
**S. P. Muthuraman** (Director)	**Seema** (Actress)
Critics Best Actor – Tamil
**Vikram for** **Deiva Thirumagal**
Best Male Debut
**Aadi for** **Prema Kavali**
Best Female Debut
**Shruti Haasan for** **7 Aum Arivu** **and Anaganaga O Dheerudu**

== Multiple nominations and awards ==
The following films received multiple nominations.

=== Kannada ===
- Nominations
  - 8 nominations: Hudugaru
  - 6 nominations: Paramathma
  - 5 nominations: Lifeu Ishtene, Sanju Weds Geetha, Krishnan Marriage Story, Saarathi
  - 4 nominations: Kempe Gowda, Olave Mandhara
  - 2 nominations: Bettada Jeeva, Puttakkana Highway
  - 1 nomination: Vishnuvardhana, Jarasandha
- Awards
  - 4 awards: Sanju Weds Geetha
  - 2 awards: Olave Mandhara
  - 1 award: Lifeu Ishtene, Hudugaru, Kempe Gowda, Puttakkana Highway

=== Malayalam ===
- Nominations
  - 9 nominations: Salt N' Pepper
  - 8 nominations: Pranayam
  - 6 nominations: Beautiful, Indian Rupee
  - 4 nominations: Traffic, Urumi
  - 2 nominations: Adaminte Makan Abu, Chappa Kurish
  - 1 nomination: Arabiyum Ottakavum P. Madhavan Nairum, City of God, Khaddama, Makaramanju, Mohabbath, Nayika, Rathinirvedam, Snehaveedu, Swapna Sanchari, The Train
- Awards
  - 4 awards: Pranayam
  - 2 awards: Indian Rupee, Traffic
  - 1 award: Adaminte Makan Abu, Khaddama

=== Tamil ===
- Nominations
  - 9 nominations: Deiva Thirumagal
  - 7 nominations: 7 Aum Arivu
  - 6 nominations: Aadukalam, Ko
  - 5 nominations: Vaagai Sooda Vaa
  - 4 nominations: Mankatha
  - 3 nominations: Engaeyum Eppothum
  - 2 nominations: Engeyum Kadhal, Mayakkam Enna, Nootrenbadhu
  - 1 nomination : Kaavalan, Mappillai, Siruthai
- Awards
  - 5 awards: Aadukalam(1)
  - 2 awards: Engaeyum Eppothum, Ko, Vaagai Sooda Vaa
  - 1 award : Deiva Thirumagal (1), 7 Aum Arivu (1)

=== Telugu ===
- Nominations
  - 10 nominations: Dookudu
  - 9 nominations: Sri Rama Rajyam
  - 6 nominations: Mr. Perfect
  - 5 nominations: 100% Love, Ala Modalaindi, Rajanna
  - 4 nominations: Kandireega
  - 1 nomination: Jai Bolo Telangana, Anaganaga O Dheerudu, Gaganam, Golconda High School, Oosaravelli, Dhada
- Awards
  - 6 awards: Dookudu
  - 3 awards: Sri Rama Rajyam
  - 1 award: Anaganaga O Dheerudu (1), Badrinath (1), Rajanna, Prema Kavali (1)

- Number in brackets after the film title indicates the number of special awards included, which have no nominees.
