= Minchina Ota =

Minchina Ota may refer to:

- Minchina Ota (1980 film)
- Minchina Ota (2008 film)
