= Incident (festival) =

- Genre: Cultural festival
- Locations: Surathkal, Mangalore, India
- Founded: 1980
- Attendance: 45,000 Footfall, 700 colleges
- Filing status: Student Run, Non-Profit Organization
- Sponsor: National Institute of Technology Surathkal
- Website: incident.nitk.ac.in

Incident is the annual cultural festival of the National Institute of Technology Karnataka (NITK) in Surathkal, Karnataka, India. The fest is a four-day-long event held in March in the even semester of the NITK Calendar. The fest brings together students from different colleges all over India, attracting an estimated annual footfall of about 45,000 people, and boasts a number of competitive events, workshops, competitions and performances as well as pro-shows by widely known and popular artists including the likes of Sunidhi Chauhan, Salim–Sulaiman, Amaal Malik, Amit Trivedi, Benny Dayal, the duo of Vishal–Shekhar and Javed Ali among many others.

== History ==
The fest was started by the students of the college, the then Karnataka Regional Engineering College led by Umar Teekay during the 1980s, with a budget of Rs. 10000, and has been continued and amplified every year since. By 1985, Incident events were split between the Student Activity Center and the Silver Jubilee Auditorium. By the beginning of the 1990s, the fest had gained ample popularity among Mangaloreans. In 1992, one of the then biggest industries of Mangalore – PVS Beedies Pvt. Ltd. sponsored Incident when it created history by holding Fashion show contests for the first time.

Incident in the 2000s was Gen Ys' fest where popular and new cultural norms were rising every day. However, the biggest revolution happened during Incident 2005 with the introduction of “Pronites” that took the celebration to a whole new level with Parikrama playing their groovy tunes to the cheers of the huge throng of students. Incident 2006 marked the first “Beach events” that were held in the college's very own private beach. Incident 2009-2015 was Incident's golden years where the fest went countrywide. Participation from colleges around Karnataka and around the rest of the country was at a new high. Appearances by the biggest celebrities of Bollywood like KK, Sunidhi Chauhan and Vishal–Shekhar were just one night of the extravagant five-day fest held in the blistering heat of Mangalore summer. Musicians and bands of exquisite caliber and the concepts of world fest made Incident the largest fest of South India.

== Events ==
Incident hosts an exciting plethora of multi-faceted events and workshops over the course of 4 days.

=== Haute Couture ===
Having been the flagship Fashion event of Incident for many years, Haute Couture has risen up the ranks to become one of the biggest events of its kind in India. Boasting judges in the ranks of popular models like Urvi Shetty and participants from a large number of colleges, a showcase of glamour and glitz, Haute Couture proves to be a night to remember.

=== Musical Events ===
Amateur and Semi-Professional bands are provided an opportunity to showcase their immense talent in the various competitive musical events. The most popular events Incident was a stage to include the Bandish, the Eastern rock competition, and Pulse, its western counterpart. These events have seen the rise of many famous bands in the Indian Rock scene such as Dark Lights, The Down Troddence, Phlegmatic, Mount N' Do, Tatvam, Pure Veg, BRIXITI, Churmuri chai to name a few. Other events include solo singing, acoustic and instrumental events in classical eastern and western genres.

=== Dance ===
Dance events are at the heart of the day-events at Incident. The widely popular, fiercely competitive dance events at Incident include Step Up solo dance, Step Up duet, street dance, Tandav and Promenade (western group dance). Students from various colleges throng the events, battling it out to win coveted titles.

=== Beach events ===
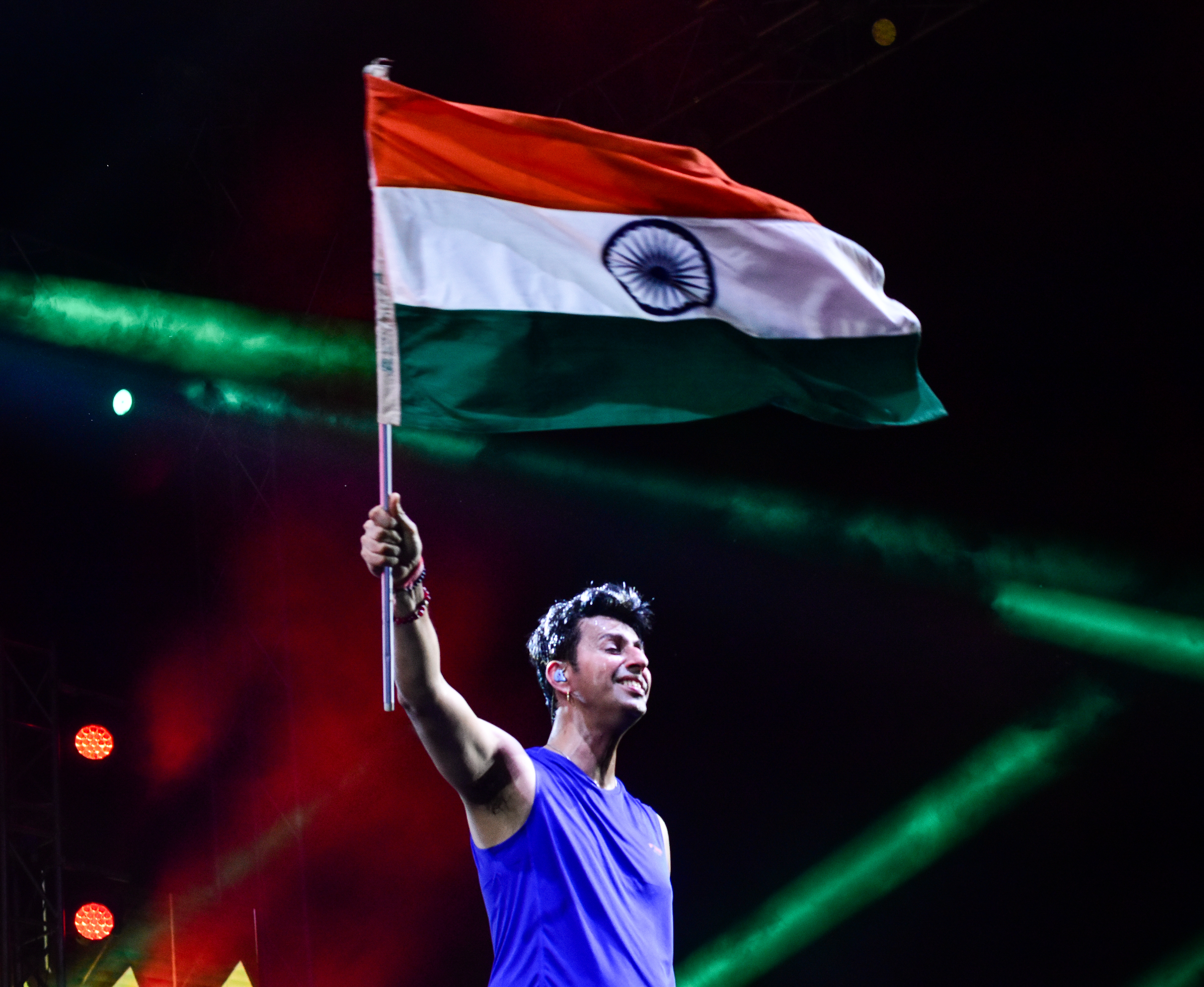
Salim–Sulaiman at Incident 2020

Boasting their own private beach, NITK hosts a wide variety of events including beach volleyball, beach football and Sandemonium events. The 2012 edition also included adventure sports like zorbing, rappelling and parasailing. Over the years, beach events have only gotten more intense with an all new line up and events such as the Kite Festival, Beach Informals and light music events.

=== Sports Events ===
Slam Dunk is the widely popular college level basketball competition that hosts over 100 colleges from all over the country battling it out in an event that spans all days of Incident, to bask in the glory of being crowned Slam Dunk champions.

SpinShock is the thrilling inter-collegiate throwball competition blending a mix of spin, precision and grace and boasting teams from a number of colleges.

=== Literature ===
The literature program includes several quizzes as well as word games, spelling bees, and short story contests, held in English, Kannada and Hindi. Quiz events include a General quiz, Asia Quiz, MELAS quiz, India quiz, Lone Wolf (individual quiz event), Biz quiz, sports quiz, and entertainment quiz. The general quiz is hosted by a guest quiz master every year and has been sponsored by Myra school of business and Nexus consulting. A variety of Kannada and Hindi events are also organized including Antakshari, debates, and Dumb Charades.

=== Potpourri ===
Hosting creative and fun events including Frames and Expose (exhibition of photographs from contests by the Photography Club), a Hogathon, Speech Triathlon (Declamation, Commentary and Policy) and an Escape Room among several others.

=== I-Care ===
I-Care is the social initiative wing of Incident. The Beach-Schooling initiative is aimed at teaching children belonging to the fishing community households and instilling in them an interest in the wonderful world of education. Volunteers also teach extra-curricular activities like origami and dance. 14 Solar lamps to Beach- schooling children and 5 solar lamps to children from NITK Kannada Medium School were distributed on Children's Day.

Team Incident, in association with the Centre for System Design. NITK Surathkal, have come up with a plastic recycling initiative to recycle plastic wastes from the beach using injection molding to create small, useful products like keychains, clips etc.

=== Workshops ===
A variety of workshops are held during Incident such as juggling, B-boying, Bhangra, martial arts, theatre, balloon modelling, HDR photography and portraiture in 2012. Previous editions included workshops on kite flying, Salsa, jive, chocolate making, tai chi, kick boxing, wildlife photography and animation. New inclusions have been added to the list like caricature-making, dance workshop by Hip-Hop International and mixed martial arts.

The 2012 event included a vintage auto expo for the first time, including more than thirty vintage cars, motorcycles and mopeds. as well as a Marathon run.

=== Gaming ===
For all the gaming enthusiasts, Incident also hosts gaming events including PUBG, DOTA, NFS, FIFA and Counter-Strike.

=== Biz Events ===
Hosted by the School of Management, NITK Surathkal, Business events take centre-stage with Biz Quiz, Mock Stock and Mock Press.

=== InciTalks ===
A forum for exchanging knowledge and fresh ideas, Inci Talks is a platform for students to listen to and gain immense perspectives on diverse fields from eminent delegates and distinguished personalities from across the country. InciTalks has proudly hosted prominent and notable personalities among the ranks of Dr. Ullas Karanth, Ricky Kej, Balaji Vishwanathan, Yogendra Singh, Prachi Tehlan, Dr. Jayaprakash Narayana, Commander Kailash Girwalkat, Aparajita Amar, Vungarala V Subrahmanyam, Harish Hande, Malathi Krishnamurthy Holla, Yogesh Ghaturle among several others.

=== Proshows ===
Incident Proshows feature various national and international artists spanning various genres of music including rock, heavy metal, pop, electronic and Sufi music. The festival's Pro-Nite event has featured top Indian artists including Parikrama in 2005, Euphoria in 2006, Raghu Dixit and Indian Ocean in 2007, KK in 2008 and again in 2010, Nikhil Chinapa and Kunal Ganjawala in 2009, Motherjane in 2010, Sunidhi Chauhan in 2011, Javed Ali in March 2013, Salim–Sulaiman, in March 2014. 2015 Proshow boasted Vishal-Shekar, 2017 witnessed the Local Train, Masala Coffee, Lost Stories and the RedBull Tourbus. Benny Dayal, Itaca band, Zaeden and Ritviz set the stages on fire in 2018, while Amaal Malik stole the limelight in 2019.

== Sponsors ==
Incident 2012 was powered by Namma Metro as title sponsor, and associate sponsors, NICE. Reliance led Incident 2014 as title sponsors. Incident has had several other sponsors including Zappstore.com, Himalaya Herbals, Quest, Syndicate Bank, Flipkart.com, KPCL, Tata Tea, KSFC, T.I.M.E, 98.3 Radio Mirchi, City Center, Channel [V], ONGC MRPL, AIRCEL, Chevrolet, Coca-Cola and The Ocean Pearl. The Hindu supported Incident as media partner in 2011. Other notable associations include Hindustan Petroleum, Maruti Suzuki, Coke Studio, Airtel, British Council, KTM, Adani, Saavn, LIC, PlayStation, Sephora, Mysore Minerals Limited, Bharat Petroleum, BookMyShow, Canara Bank, Comedy Central, Ideal IceCream, Namma TV, Nestle, SBI, VH1, Cardolite, Deccan Herald, ICICI bank, Hangyo, Karnataka Tourism, Hip Hop International, King's College London, Corporation Bank, Karnataka Bank, The Ramco Cements, NMPT.

== Incident 2023 ==
Incident 2023, a 42nd edition of Incident will be conducted from 16 March to 19 March this year as was revealed by India’s Honorable Minister of Education, Skill Development and Entrepreneurship, Shri Dharmendra Pradhan in the NITK Campus on October 15, 2022.

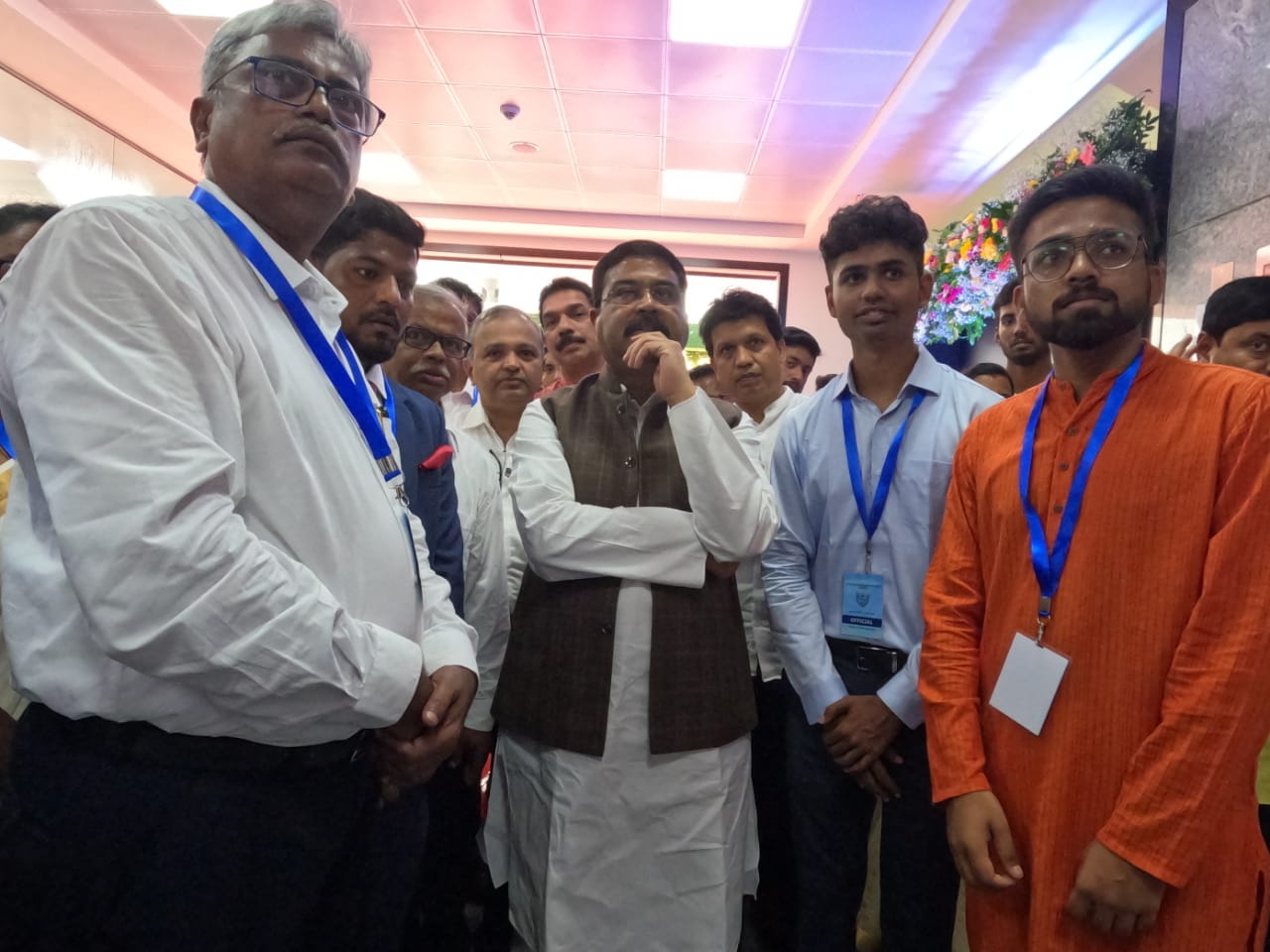
Incident'23 dates revealed by Hon'ble Minister of Education and Minister of Skill Development and Entrepreneurship, Shri Dharmendra Pradhan.

More than 45,000 students from 200+ colleges all across India are expected to attend this event and going to take part in the competitions.

Visit https://incident.nitk.ac.in/ for registrations and more information.

=== Sponsors ===
Title Sponsors - TribeVibe.

Co-Sponsors - Reliance, Uniball.

Associate Sponsors - Karnataka State Pollution Control Board, Mysore Sandal Soap.

Platinum Sponsors - Bosch.

Diamond Sponsors - Karnataka Power Transmission Company Limited.

Gold Sponsors - Hutti Gold Mines.

Silver Sponsors - State Bank of India.
