= Aarohi (cultural festival) =

Recurring cultfest of VNIT, Nagpur, Maharashtra, India

Aarohi, VNIT Nagpur
- Genre: Student Run, Non-Profit Cultural Event
- Locations: Nagpur, India
- Founded: 1988
- Attendance: 25,000 footfall, 70 colleges

Aarohi is the annual cultural festival (Cultfest) of Visvesvaraya National Institute of Technology, Nagpur, India. It is among some of the largest events in the Central India region which typically lasts for three days. Pioneered by the 1989 batch of VNIT, Aarohi today forms a central part of Visvesvaraya National Institute of Technology's cultural landscape.

== History ==
It was conceptualized in 1988, and given final form in 1989. This cultural festival provides students an environment to enjoy and promote arts, literature, music, and culture through multiple individual events, competitions, and avenues. The name Aarohi derives from the Sanskrit word for a crescendo of musical notes, a testament to the ever-increasing zeal and passion of organizers, as well as the desire to take the festival above and beyond year after year.

Aarohi has been a longstanding hub of cultural activity in the Region, hosting multiple events, performances, and artists over its three-day schedule. Some well-known artists to have graced the performances include Papon, in Aarohi 2017, Kanan Gill, Aarohi 2018, The Local Train, Aarohi Celebrating 30 years.

== Main events ==
With new additions every year, A La Danse, Cynosure, Pentathlon, Purple Haze, Abhivyakti, Art Conoscenza, Halla Bol, and Swarmanzar are the few signature competitions organized at every Aarohi. Abhivyakti is a dramatic event that includes stage plays and mimes. Halla Bol usually includes a social message embedded in street plays. Over the years Aarohi has seen some of the finest play performances. A La Danse and Swarmanzar are the dancing and singing competitions that attract participants from different genres and dancing styles. Pentathlon, a group event with tasks ranging from a wide spectrum of the area is a hit amongst the participants.

=== Halla Bol ===
Halla Bol is the street play contest, teams from across the region assemble at VNIT to partake in the event. The event also hosts some of the most well-known artists from the region's play and theater landscape in its jury. Year after year, the event has remained a crowd-puller as teams from across the region present their performances to a mesmerized crowd. The plays typically take the form of nukkad nataks, street plays that focus on highlighting a social issue. The topic of the play coupled with amazing performances mean that the event has been a constant favourite at Aarohi, for audiences, participants, and jury alike.

=== Cynosure ===
Cynosure is the personality contest consisting of various rounds that test the character and composure of the participant, a jury panel composed of well-known celebrities like Minnie Rohilla (Aarohi 2018) and Devika Singh (Aarohi 2019) coupled with a suspenseful and exciting grand finale ensure that this event remains a fan favourite.

=== Purple Haze ===
It is the flagship event of Aarohi which pulls a large chunk of music lovers.

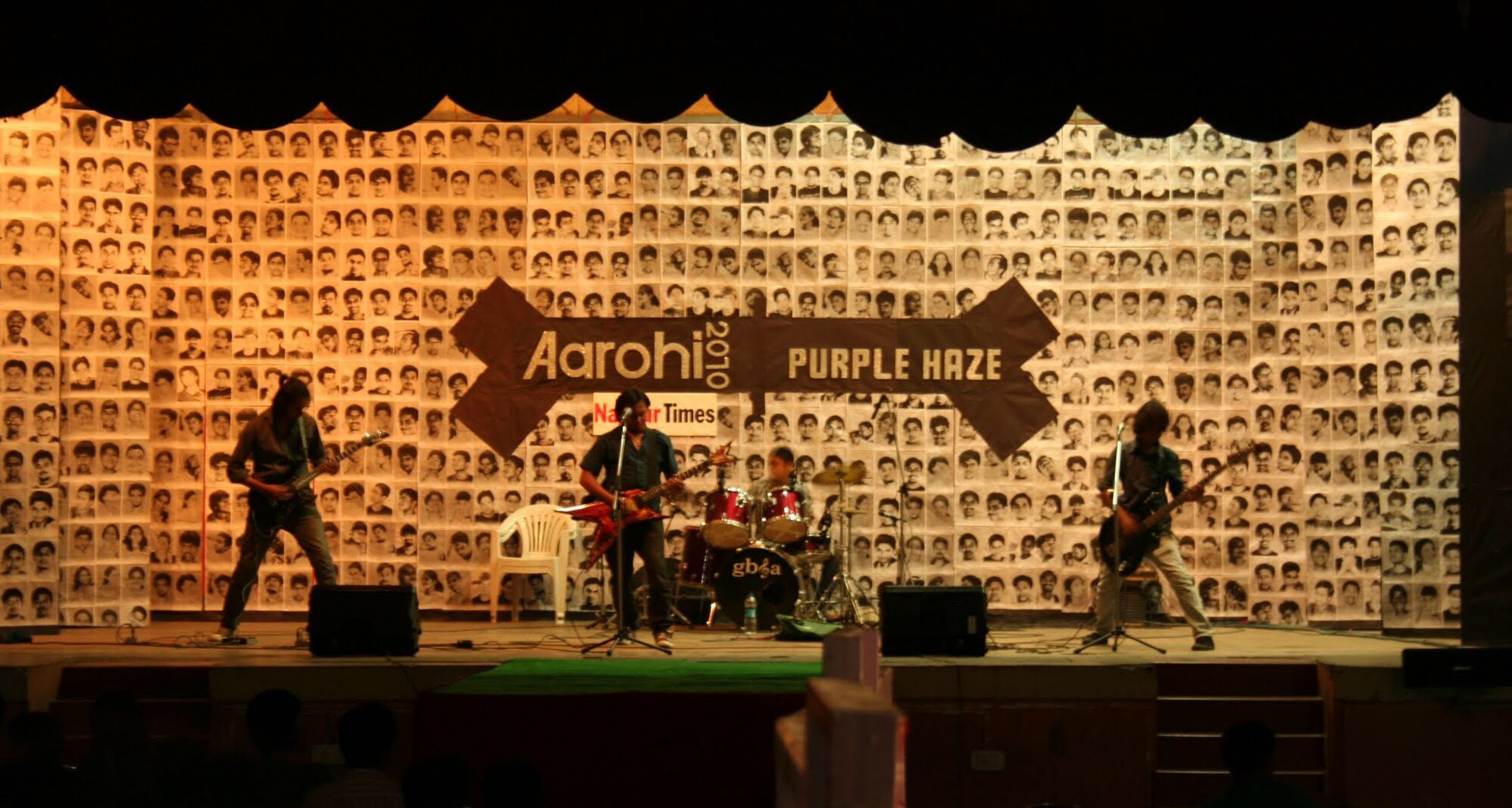
Purple Haze Band Contest: Aarohi

VNIT has witnessed many performances as well as fusions. This event is well received by a crowd of fans of music genres like rock, and heavy metal, and often acts as a hub for rock bands of the region to present their performances to an enthusiastic crowd. Some of the highlights are the performance of Shor Bazaar and Indigo Children in 2009, Workshop band in 2010, Faridkot. in 2011.

== Other events ==
Apart from the main events, several other events are organized including Shutter-Bug, Madhur Antakshari, Big Fight and Instrumentals. Art Conoscenza includes various shades of sub-events like graffiti, collage, charcoal painting, T-shirt painting, street art, face painting, etc. Art exhibition displays fine arts for all three days of the main event.

=== Informal ===
The festival includes various on-spot crazy and interesting events that always successfully grab the attention of the crowd.

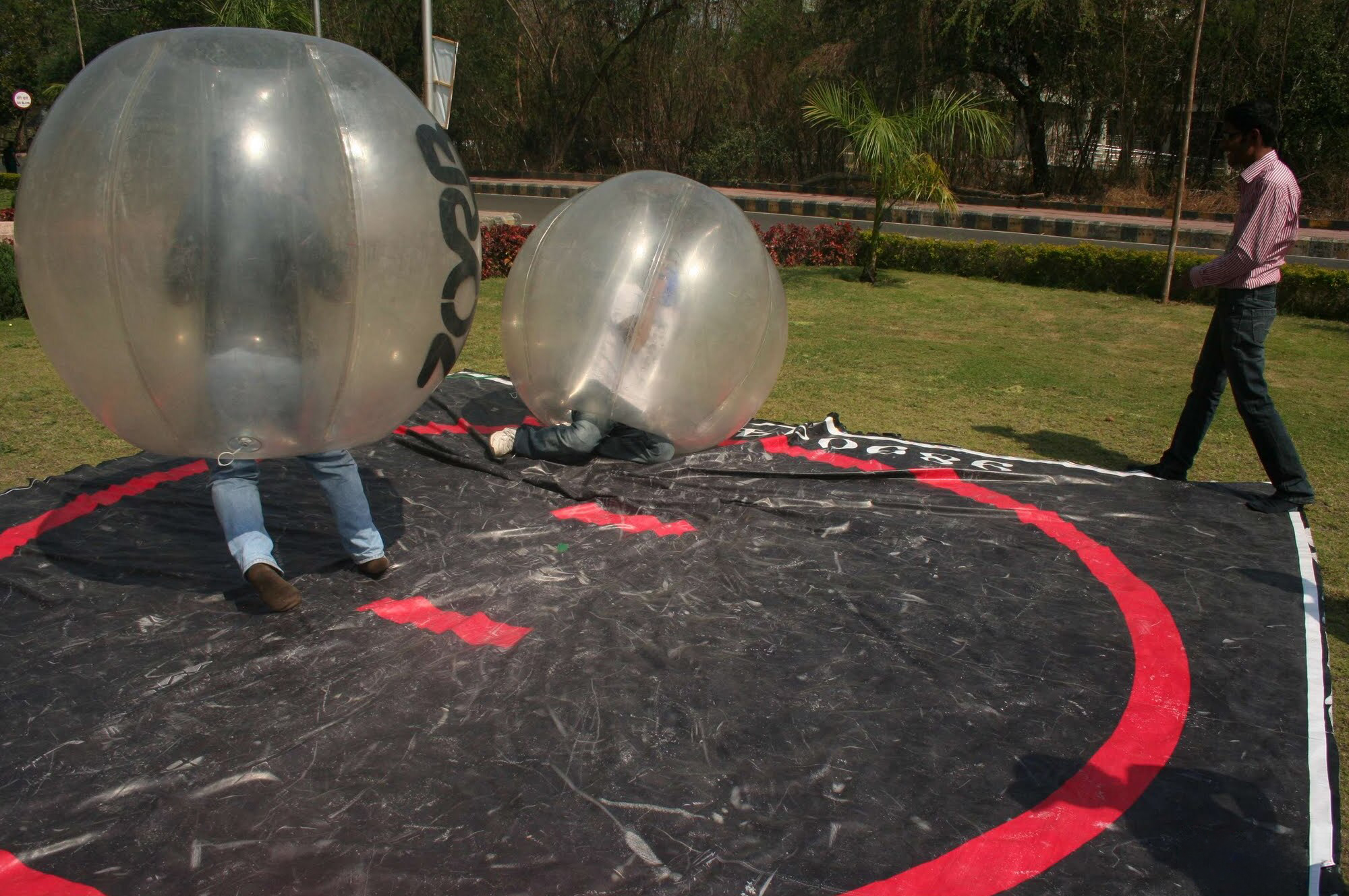
Informal Events At Aarohi

The main attractions are paintball, human Foosball, zorbing while many other events like 60 seconds, Rab ne Bana di Jodi, Vahi pe Nigaahen Vahi pe Nishana, etc. have been engaging the crowd from past many editions of Aarohi. In 2011, there were a total of 33 informals organized with a massive response.

=== Social cause ===
As an attempt to give back to the society, Aarohi donates the proceedings from Cult Nite (curtain-raiser and charity event of Aarohi) as a charity [no source provided]. Aarohi has donated to various NGOs such as Baba Amte's Anandvan, Amhi Amchya Arogyasathi, Shraddhananda Anathalaya, Sweekar, CAFE and Kritadnyata and continues this practice of social responsibility. Cycle rally is organized every year in an attempt to promote cycling as a means to curb the menace of global warming as well as to create awareness about various tempting issues.

=== Proshows ===
Professional (sic) shows are one of the main attractions of Aarohi which features performances by indie bands and/or artists. Various brands like Indigo Children, Parikrama, Agnee, Raghu Dixit Project have performed at Aarohi previously.

In the 2015 edition, Aarohi hosted Nagpur's first Coke Studio and Sunburn events.

Some of the famous performers from the previous editions include Euophoria & Kenny Sebastian (2016); Papon (Spring 2017); The Local Train & Zakir Khan (Fall 2017); Naalayak, Kanan Gill & Seezi (2018); Sachet-Parampara & Aakash Gupta (2019).

Aarohi has also shown support for local culture by hosting performance of artists like Avadhoot Gupte, Mahesh Kale, Swapnil Bandodkar etc.

== See also ==
- Visvesvaraya National Institute of Technology
