= Jag Changa =

Studio album by The Raghu Dixit Project
- Released: November 23, 2013
- Recorded: 2010–2013
- Genre: Folk
- Length: 44:05
- Producer: Raghu Dixit

The Raghu Dixit Project chronology
Antaragni – The Fire Within (2007)	Jag Changa (2013)

Jag Changa (The World is Beautiful) is the second studio album by the Indian band The Raghu Dixit Project released on November 23, 2013, through Wandering Minstrel Records. The album features songs in Hindi and Kannada. The album features artists including Raghu Dixit as the lead vocalist and others he met during his concerts in the UK. It includes members of the British folk band, Bellowhead, American clawhammer banjo player, Abigail Washburn and sarod player Soumik Datta.

== Development ==
Jag Changa was the second studio album of The Raghu Dixit Project after their first album, Antaragni – The Fire Within came out in late 2007. The band did a soft launch of this album in November 2013 at the NH7 Weekender festival in Bangalore. In 2013, in an interview with Mumbai Boss, Raghu Dixit said that the band recorded 13 to 14 songs for the album and later finalised on the best eight.

The tracks in the album include "Parasiva", a Kannada song, the lyrics to which was written by Raghavendra Kamath, who had formerly worked with Dixit in the 2010 Kannada film, Just Math Mathalli. On the song, Dixit said, "The song is about how when life throws so many situations at you and you want to give up, that’s when a stranger walks into your life and does a small little thing from his perspective but for you it would move mountains." Dixit said that the song has lyrics written in the rural Mysore dialect of Kannada language. Of "Rain Song", Dixit said the song was written and composed ten years ago prior to the album's release. The Tamil song "Amma" ("Mother") was written by Madan Karky, the son of Tamil lyricist Vairamuthu. Dixit said the song was a dedication to his mother and was Dixit's first song in Tamil. The folk songs "Lokada Kalaji" and "Kodagana Koli Nungitha", written by the 19th century Kannada poet Shishunala Sharif, were also included in the album.

== Track listing ==
Jag Changa track listing
No.	Title	Lyrics	Length
1.	"Parasiva"	Raghavendra Kamath	4:38
2.	"Rain Song"	Niraj Singh Rajawat	7:17
3.	"Jag Changa"	Niraj Singh Rajawat	4:50
4.	"Yaadon Ki Kyari"	Ankur Tewari	4:36
5.	"Amma"	Madhan Karky	5:28
6.	"Lokada Kalaji"	Shishunala Sharif	4:53
7.	"Sajana"	Niraj Singh Rajawat	7:05
8.	"Kodagana Koli Nungitha"	Shishunala Sharif	5:18
Total length:			44:05
