= Baang (film) =

Indian action black comedy film

- Theatrical release poster
- Directed by: Sree Ganesh Parashuram
- Written by: Sree Ganesh Parashuram; Ritvik Muralidhar
- Produced by: Pooja Vasant Kumar
- Starring: Shanvi Srivastava; Raghu Dixit; Sathvika Appaiah
- Cinematography: Udith Leela
- Edited by: Vijeth Chandra
- Music by: Ritvik Muralidhar
- Production company: UK Productions
- Release date: 18 August 2023
- Country: India
- Language: Kannada

Baang is a 2023 Indian Kannada-language action black comedy film directed by Sree Ganesh Parashuram and produced by Pooja Vasant Kumar under the banner of UK Productions. The film features Shanvi Srivastava, Raghu Dixit, Ritvik Muralidhar, Sunil Gujjar, Natya Ranga and Saathvika Appaiah.

Baang was released on 18 August 2023 where it received mixed reviews from critics.

== Synopsis ==
Aarav, Bhushan and Sunil are best friends who are forced to retrieve a narcotics bag worth ₹40 crore for a gangster named Daddy in order to rescue Aarav's brother Ayush. Trouble ensues for the trio as Daddy's rival Leona and her gang tries to retrieve the bag from them. With the emerging trouble, the trio sets on a race-against-time to save Ayush from the clutches of the gangsters.

== Cast ==
- Shanvi Srivastava as Leona
- Raghu Dixit as Daddy
- Sathvika Appaiah
- Ritvik Muralidhar as Aarav
- Natya Ranga as Bhushan
- Sunil Gujjar as Sunil
- Nagendra Shah
- MS Jahangeer

== Production ==
The film was announced in June 2021 and was titled as Baang. Sudeep has lent his voice to the film.

== Soundtrack ==
The background score and soundtrack was composed by Ritvik Muralidhar. The first song, titled "We Are Back Again", was released on 20 August 2021.

Tracklist
| No. | Title | Lyrics | Singer(s) | Length |
|---|---|---|---|---|
| 1. | "We are Back Again" | Lavanya Narasimhan | Lavanya Narasimhan, Jayanthi Narasimhan | 3:19 |
| 2. | "Dhaga Dhaga" | Nagarjun Sharma | Chethan Gandharva, Charvi Muralidhar | 3:44 |
| 3. | "Slow Motion" | Sree Ganesh Parashuram | All Ok | 3:37 |
| 4. | "Aata Senasaata" | Nagarjun Sharma | Jonita Gandhi | 3:54 |

== Reception ==
Baang received mixed-to-positive reviews from critics. Harish Basavarajaiah of The Times of India gave 3 out of 5 stars and wrote "Baang makes for a decent entertainer if you have the heart to forgive the minor mistakes of the newbies." A.Sharadhaa of The New Indian Express gave 2.5 out of 5 stars and wrote "While Baang may not fulfill all the check boxes of an unequivocal entertainer, it undoubtedly deserves recognition for its innovative presentation."

Y Maheswara Reddy of Bangalore Mirror gave 3 out of 5 stars and reviewed the film as a "worth a watch" for its action sequences and suspense element. Prathibha Joy of OTTplay gave 2.5 out of 5 stars and wrote "Baang feels like a prime example of a squandered opportunity. There was promise, but it didn’t quite live up to it. However, if you were to set aside logic and watch it as nothing but ‘timepass’, it may still be appealing."
