= Kote (film) =

- VCD cover
- Directed by: Srinivas Raju
- Written by: Srinivas Raju
- Produced by: Manjunath; GN Murthy
- Starring: Prajwal Devaraj; Gayatri Rao
- Cinematography: K. Datthu
- Edited by: R. Shyam; R. Shivaprasad
- Music by: Abhilash Lakra
- Distributed by: KK Films
- Release date: 11 February 2011
- Running time: 119 minutes
- Country: India
- Language: Kannada

Kote is a 2011 Kannada-language film directed by Srinivas Raju and produced by Manjunath and GN Murthy. Prajwal Devaraj and Gayatri Rao are the lead pair of the film. Raghu Dixit has composed the music for the film. Ashley Mendonca & Abhilash Lakra have scored the background music. It is one amongst P. Ravi Shankar's three films he acted in before he gained massive recognition through Kempe Gowda. The other two being Halli Krishna Delhi Radha and Mana Mecchida Sose.

== Plot ==
The movie is based on a triangular love story.

== Cast ==
- Prajwal Devaraj as Vignesh
- Gayatri Rao
- Dimple Chopra
- P. Ravi Shankar as Katari
- Ravi
- Shivashankar

== Soundtrack ==
- "Minchinante": Sumanth (Rap), Raghu Dixit, Vijay Prakash, Akansha Badami, Alexis D'Souza
- "Shringaara Lokada": Akansha Badami, Deepak Doddera
- "Yaaradu Heli Swalpa": Vijay Prakash, Naina Puttaswamy
- "Nooru Nooru Koti": Haricharan, Saindhavi
- "Jagave Banna Banna": Raghu Dixit
- "Yelavo Dhoota": Raghu Dixit, Pradeep

== Reception ==
=== Critical response ===
Shruti Indira Lakshminarayana of Rediff.com scored the film at 2 out of 5 stars and says "Music by Raghu Dixit is lacking ion magic this time. Despite having some of the industry's best lyricists on board, words also fail to move you. The dialogues, however, are impactful. Tough cops and their fight against social evils has been dealt before but the film is definitely a better outcome than Nannavanu" A critic from The New Indian Express wrote "As far as the performance of the artistes is concerned, Prajwal looks pale in front of Ravishankar. It is the latter who walks away with all honours. It is a worth watch for those who love action-oriented flicks" A critic from Deccan Herald wrote "Mumbai-based actress Dimple has nothing much to do. Dance director Shivashankar, who has an important role in the film, is irritating. "Kote" has enjoyable entertainment quotient and good performances from Prajwal and Ravishankar". A critic from DNA wrote "From here begins a complete action feast, with bloody murders, loud and roaring dialogues and some cleverly crafted acting sequences. Ravishankar, who plays the villain, is a revelation and is surely going to be signed on by many more. Prajwal Devaraj, who plays an ACP in the film, is earnest and his hard work shows. Dimple Chopra and an item song by Rachana Maurya offer the skin show feast for the masses. Watch it if you will". A critic from The Times of India scored the film at 3 out of 5 stars and wrote "While Prajwal Devaraj scores full marks for his brilliant and matured performance, Ravishankar walks away with all honours for the villain's role. Navya impresses, though she has little to do. Music by Raghu Dixit is good but does not suit an action film like Kote. Cinematography by K Datta is satisfactory".
