= Nee (band) =

- Origin: Bangalore, India
- Genres: Folk, Fusion, Arabic, Classical, Pop, Rock
- Years active: 2009 – Present
- Label: Nee Music Rating by RadioGirmit
- Members: Siddeshwar; Sairam; Vikram Joshi; Sumithra; Priya Yadav
- Website: http://www.bandnee.com

Nee is a Kannada music band, founded by Siddeshwar, released their debut album on Nee Music in June 2009. They are notably the first band composed of IT professionals that make Kannada music.

== Filmography ==
The duo from the band, Siddeshwar and Vikram has composed music for a Sandalwood film Jai Hind, produced by Major Srinivas Pujar.

== Early days ==
The thought process emanated early in the year 2001 with an objective of making music albums. Siddeshwar, the founder of Nee, went on a talent search to build a strong music team to make innovative songs. Sairam became a strong pillar of Nee since 2004 and composed several Hindi songs which include a Nee Album Hit score 'Pahadi'.

Nee became a complete music troop in the year 2007 with Sumitra and Joshi joining in. The Nee group performed live on 15 December 2008 on the sets of TV9 (National News Channel) that became a big booster for them to create a music album.

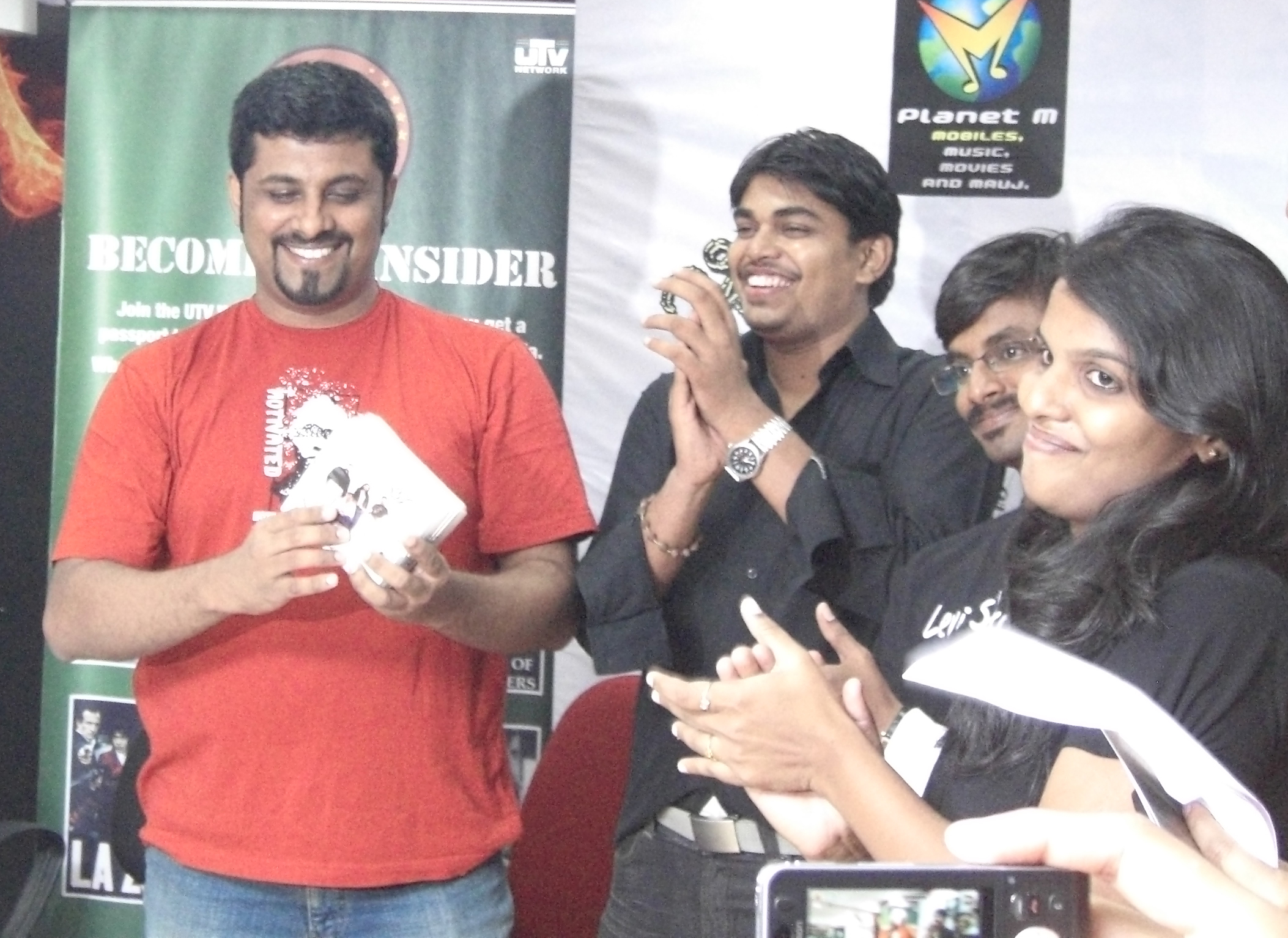
Audio Release of Nee on 27 June 2009 at Planet M, by Raghu Dixit

Raghu Dixit (Centre) during the audio release along with Sumithra, Siddeshwar, Vikram Joshi and Sairam

== Discography ==
=== 2009: Nee – Rebirth of Music ===
The band Nee's self-titled debut album was launched by the popular music director Raghu Dixit on the band's new independent record label 'Nee Music'.

Track	Song	Singer(s)	Composer(s)	Lyricist(s)	Length
01	Kuniyona	Sumithra	Siddeshwar, Sumithra	Siddeshwar	4:14
02	Malenaadavanu	Sairam	Siddeshwar, Sairam	Siddeshwar	5:10
03	Ee Nayanagalu	Sumithra	Siddeshwar, Sumithra	Siddeshwar	4:07
04	Marulaade	Joshi	Joshi	Siddeshwar, Ravi	4:16
05	Noorase	Sumithra, Sairam, Joshi	Siddeshwar, Sairam	Siddeshwar	4:28
06	Manasaagide	Joshi	Joshi	Joshi, Niranjan	3:36
07	Nee	Sumithra, Joshi	Siddeshwar, Sumithra	Siddeshwar	4:40
08	Dastak	Sairam	Siddeshwar, Sairam	Sairam	5:39
09	Tunturu	Sairam	Siddeshwar, Sairam	Siddeshwar	3:54
10	Pahadi	Sairam	Siddeshwar, Sairam	Sairam	5:11
11	Pahadi (unplugged)	Sairam	Siddeshwar, Sairam	Sairam	4:42
12	Nee (Remix)	Sarada, Sairam	Siddeshwar, Sumithra	Siddeshwar	4:21
