= Kempe Gowda (film) =

2011 Indian Kannada-language action film

- Film poster
- Directed by: Sudeepa
- Written by: Anil Kumar (dialogues)
- Screenplay by: Sudeepa
- Story by: Hari
- Based on: Singam by Hari
- Produced by: Shankar Gowda; Halappa
- Starring: Sudeepa; Ragini Dwivedi; P. Ravi Shankar; Girish Karnad
- Cinematography: S. Krishna
- Edited by: N. M. Vishwa
- Music by: Arjun Janya
- Production company: Shankar Productions
- Distributed by: Shankar Productions; Eros International
- Release date: 10 March 2011
- Running time: 141 minutes
- Country: India
- Language: Kannada
- Box office: ₹8 crore

Kempe Gowda is a 2011 Kannada-language action film directed by Sudeepa, with dialogues by Anil Kumar, and produced by Shankar Gowda under Shankar Productions. The film stars Sudeepa and Ragini Dwivedi, alongside P. Ravi Shankar, Girish Karnad, Sharan, Mohan Juneja, Orata Prashanth, Karthik Jayaram and Jai Jagadish. It is the remake of the Tamil film Singam. The music was composed by Arjun Janya, while cinematography and editing were handled by S. Krishna and N. M. Vishwa respectively.

Kempegowda was released on 10 March 2011 and became one of the highest-grossing Kannada films of 2011. A namesake sequel titled Kempegowda 2 was released in 2019, but it became a box office bomb.

== Plot ==
Kempegowda, an honest SI, lives in Rona, Gadag district, and is assisted by his bumbling colleague Pashupati. His family business is provision stores and Kempegowda wants to join it, but he joined the police force due to his father's wishes. Kempegowda resolves most of the problems in his village with non-violence and mutual counseling. He uses force only when the situation demands it, thereby gaining much reputation and love from the villagers.

Mahadev, an industrialist in Bangalore and a friend of Kempegowda's father, arrives at the village with his daughters Kavya and Divya. Kempegowda initially assumes Kavya is a prankster when she is about to prank her cousin by wearing a tiger costume. While roaming around the village, Kempegowda accidentally slaps Kavya, but later apologizes to her. Kavya gets moved by this and slowly falls in love with him. After some hilarious incidents, Kavya professes her love to Kempegowda.

Initially taken aback, Kempegowda reciprocates Kavya's love. Aarumugam, a Bangalore-based gangster infamous for extortion and kidnapping, is required to travel to Rona to sign a conditional bail after forcing a builder to commit suicide. Aarumugam instead sends one of his allies to do the formalities, an enraged Kempegowda. Kempegowda demands that Aarumugam sign the bail in person. A humiliated Aarumugam reaches Rona, but is unable to take any revenge on Kempegowda, fearing the immense love and devotion of the entire village towards Kempegowda.

Using his political contacts, Aarumugam gets Kempegowda transferred to Bangalore to teach him a lesson. Unaware of Aarumugam's hand behind his transfer, Kempegowda joins the Magadi Road police station. His co-worker SI Bose hates Aarumugam for his crimes, but is unable to take any action because of Aarumugam's political powers. Kempegowda's senior Shankar is on Aarumugam's payroll and takes care in concealing and eliminating evidence of Aarumugam's crimes.

The police commissioner does not help Kempegowda as there is an unavailability of evidence against Aarumugam. Shankar warns Kempegowda to stay away from Aarumugam's case. Unable to take on Aarumugam in his stronghold, Kempegowda wants to return to his village, but is stopped by Kavya, who encourages him to fight against Aarumugam and end his crime network. Being mentally tortured by Aarumugam, Kempegowda arrests Mayil's brother Vaikunta in a fake case of illegally smuggling alcohol. He thwarts off Shankar in full view of the public when Shankar, bounded by his duties to Mayil, tries to protect the henchmen. Aarumugam kidnaps Divya for ransom. Kempegowda rescues her with unexpected help from the Home Minister.

Kempegowda successfully traces the origins of the kidnapping racket to Aarumugam and also gets promoted to ACP of the specially-formed Anti-Kidnapping Task Force. Mahadev, who was hostile to Kempegowda following an altercation with Kempegowda's father back at Rona, softens up and agrees to give him Kavya's hand in marriage. The entire police force, including the police commissioner and Shankar, are now on Kempegowda's side and helps him to fight Mayil. They manage to kill angry Aarumugam's henchmen, in an encounter at a hospital and begin to target everyone and everything related to Aarumugam. In retribution, Aarumugam starts targeting everyone close to Kempegowda, including Kavya, but is saved by Kempegowda, and Bose, who is hacked to death by Aarumugam. To escape from getting arrested, Mayil kidnaps the daughter of Tamil Nadu Home Minister.

Aarumugam falsely tells Kempegowda that he is going to Mangalore with her, but he is actually going to Nellore, Andhra Pradesh to put the police off the track. However, Kempegowda manages to pursue them till Gudur near Nellore, where he rescues her and kills Aarumugam in an encounter. After that, Kempegowda resigns his job publicly in a felicitation function organised for him, where he heads back to Rona with Kavya.

Kempegowda is stopped briefly by the Home Minister, who offers an undercover mission, to which he willingly agrees.

== Cast ==
- Sudeepa as Kempe Gowda
- Ragini Dwivedi as Kavya
- P. Ravi Shankar as Armugam
- Ashok Kheny as Home Minister
- Orata Prashanth as Bose
- Girish Karnad as Mahadeva, Kavya's father
- Ashok as Kempe Gowda's father
- J. Karthik as Vaikunta, Armugam's brother
- Sharan as Pashupathi, constable
- Tara as Kavya's Mother
- Chitra Shenoy as Kempe Gowda's mother
- Bullet Prakash as Thirupati
- Chiranjeevi Sarja as Ram (cameo)
- Jai Jagadish as ACP Shankar
- Vaibhav Rao
- M. N. Suresh as Armugam's lawyer
- Patre Nagaraj
- Arasu Maharaj
- Shiva Manju
- Manmohan Rai
- Mohan Juneja
- Ba. Ma. Harish
- Killer Venkatesh
- Vinayak Joshi
- Tharun Sudhir
- Tarun Chandra
- Rahul Inapur
- Kiran Rao
- Avinash Narasimharaju
- Kishori Ballal as Kavya's grandmother
- H. G. Dattatreya as Kavya's grandfather
- Ravi Varma
- Rajeev Gowda

== Soundtrack ==
Kempe Gowda

Soundtrack album by Arjun Janya
- Released: 10 January 2011
- Genre: Feature film soundtrack
- Length: 20:22
- Language: Kannada
- Label: Anand Audio
- Producer: Arjun Janya

Arjun Janya chronology
Birugaali (2009)	Kempe Gowda (2011)	Rajadhani (2011)

The soundtrack of Kempegowda was released by Anand Audio. The songs were composed by Arjun Janya with lyrics by V. Nagendra Prasad. This film marks the first collaboration of Arjun Janya with Sudeepa.

=== Track listing ===
No.	Title	Lyrics	Singer(s)	Length
1.	"Hale Radio"	Yogaraj Bhat	Sudeepa, Shamitha Malnad	3:45
2.	"Tara Tara"	Ghouse Peer	Vijay Prakash, Shreya Ghoshal, Akanksha Badami	4:40
3.	"Sri Rama Jaya Rama"	V. Nagendra Prasad	Shankar Mahadevan	4:12
4.	"Geleyane"	V. Nagendra Prasad	Naresh Iyer, Lakshmi Manmohan	3:56
5.	"Shankara"	V. Nagendra Prasad	P. Ravi Shankar, Arjun Janya	3:48

== Release ==
Kempe Gowda was released in 100+ theaters on 10 March 2011 across the state.

== Reception ==
=== Critical response ===
The Times of India gave 4/5 stars and wrote "With gripping action sequences, the movie is sure to keep you hooked." The New Indian Express wrote "The movie is worth watching and also proves to be a family entertainer with a number of scenes loaded with sentiment."

== Box office ==
Kempegowda earned ₹50 million (US$520,000) in its first week and became one of the highest-grossing Kannada films of 2011.

== Awards and nominations ==
Awards and nominations
Award	Wins	Nominations
Filmfare Awards South	1	3
South Indian International Movie Awards (SIIMA)	0	6
Suvarna Film Awards	1	N/A
Sandalwood Star Awards	1	8
Bengaluru Times Film Awards	1	5
Kannada International Music Awards (KiMA)	1	1
- Totals
Awards won	5
Nominations	23 + N/A

59th Filmfare Awards South :-

- Filmfare Award for Best Film - Kannada – Nominated
- Filmfare Award for Best Actor - Kannada – Nominated – Sudeepa
- Filmfare Award for Best Actress - Kannada – Nominated – Ragini Dwivedi
- Filmfare Award for Best Supporting Actor - Kannada – Winner – P. Ravi Shankar

1st South Indian International Movie Awards :-

- Best Actor (Male) – Kannada – Nominated – Sudeepa
- Best Actor (Female) – Kannada – Nominated – Ragini Dwivedi
- Best Actor in a Supporting Role – Kannada – Nominated – Tara
- Best Actor in a Negative Role – Kannada – Nominated – P. Ravi Shankar
- Best Playback Singer (Male) – Kannada – Nominated – Vijay Prakash for the song "Thara Thara Hidiside"
- Best Lyricist – Kannada – Nominated – Ghose Dheer for the song "Thara Thara Hidiside"

Sandalwood Star Awards :-

- Best Film – Nominated
- Best Actress – Nominated – Ragini Dwivedi
- Best Actor in a Negative Role – Nominated – P. Ravi Shankar
- Rising Star (Female) – Winner – Ragini Dwivedi
- Best Music Director – Nominated – Arjun Janya
- Best Stunt Director – Nominated – Ravi Varma
- Best Stunt Director – Nominated – Different Danny
- Best Cinematographer – Nominated – Krishna
- Best Editor – Nominated – N.M Vishwa

4th Suvarna Film Awards :-

- Best Editor – Winner – N.M. Vishwa

Bengaluru Times Film Awards :-

- Best Actor in a Negative Role – Winner – P. Ravi Shankar
- Best Film – Nominated
- Best Music Director – Nominated – Arjun Janya
- Best Lyricist – Nominated – Yogaraj Bhat for the song "Hale Radio"
- Best Playback Singer Male – Nominated – Sudeepa for the song "Hale Radio"
- Best Playback Singer Female – Nominated – Shamitha Malnad for the song "Hale Radio"

1st Kannada International Music Awards (KiMA):-

- Best Composer (Film Album) – Nominated – Arjun Janya
- Best Background Score – Winner – Arjun Janya
