= Just Maath Maathalli =

- Directed by: Sudeep
- Written by: Sudeep
- Produced by: Shanker Gowda
- Starring: Sudeep; Ramya; Rajesh Nataranga
- Cinematography: Sri Venkat
- Edited by: B. S. Kemparaju
- Music by: Raghu Dixit
- Production company: Shankar Productions
- Release date: 5 February 2010
- Running time: 133 minutes
- Country: India
- Language: Kannada

Just Maath Maathalli (English translation: Just in conversation) is a 2010 Indian Kannada romance film written and directed by Sudeep starring himself, Ramya and Rajesh Nataranga in the lead roles. The film follows Siddharth's search for Tanu to confess his love for her.

Sudeep first approached producer Shanker Gowda to produce an action film which he wanted to direct. But, during discussions of the script, the idea of Just Maath Maathalli came up and Shanker Gowda showed immense interest in producing it. Sudeep went on to script and direct the film. The film turned out to be a box-office bomb on its release but later attained a cult following.

== Plot ==
Siddharth, a singer in a rock band, leaves for Singapore from Bangalore. On the flight, he meets Adi, a screenwriter, who takes a liking to Siddharth and asks him about his trip. Siddharth tells him that he was going in search of a girl, Tanu whom he liked. An amused Adi gets him to narrate the story.

Tanu's Story- Siddharth, standing at the precipice of a suicide point is looking down the cliff when Tanu, a stranger to Siddharth, pulls him back assuming he was attempting suicide and reprimands his act without allowing him to explain his actions. Siddharth walks away and sits by a lake. Again Tanu sees him and presumes he would jump into the water in his attempt to kill himself. She rushes to stop him again and gives him another dress-down. Disgusted, he goes to a tea stall by the road and orders for coffee. As he is adding sugar-free cubes into his coffee, Tanu notices him from a distance and again assuming that he is adding poison to his coffee rushes to his side and knocks down the tumbler from his hand before he takes his first sip. Siddharth, by now evidently tired of her unsolicited good Samaritan ways, lashes back. He tells her that he was only trying to see the depth of the cliff at the suicide point, and was trying to splash some water on his face at the lake and that he was adding sugar-free cubes into his glass, all of which she misunderstood as suicidal attempts by him. He walks away after assuring her that he is NOT suicidal.

Later, at a railway station (Krishnarajanagara railway station), while waiting for his train Siddharth sees Tanu running into the station trying to catch a departing train. She misses the train anyway and sits on a bench tired. She asks the station master directions to the toilet. She decides to use the sky-walk to reach the other side of the platform, where the toilet is. As she goes up the sky-walk, Siddharth who is sitting on a bench beside hers, notices a beggar who was sitting nearby, missing. He walks up the sky-walk and witnesses the beggar trying to steal gold bangles from Tanu. He shouts at the beggar and Tanu finds this distraction enough to kick the beggar in his groin and runs towards Siddharth. They both go down and sit on a bench exhausted. They introduce themselves and Siddharth suggests he keep the bangle for safekeeping. She agrees and he tucks the bangle into his backpack.

Suddenly, Tanu sees the beggar walking back towards them with four more people. The couple makes a dash for it and hides in a dark cattle shed with a few oxen. One of the baddies enters the shed and gets kicked by an ox. The others think that Siddharth hit their partner and ran away scared.

The Next morning Tanu departs for her destination by the morning train. After she leaves, Siddharth realizes that her bangle is with him. He gets her address from a telephone booth from which she had earlier called home. He sets out for her hometown to return the bangle. He meets her and gives the bangle to her. She insists that he stay with her family for a few days. He agrees and she introduces him to her family members.

Tanu falls in love with Siddharth and he too starts liking her. On the day he is leaving, Tanu proposes her love to him. But, to her disbelief, he rejects her proposal. He then leaves to Bangalore.

On the flight- Adi is shocked and wonders why he rejected her proposal. Siddharth narrates another incident which changed him to not get emotionally involved with girls.

Flashback 3 years ago- Divya (Keerthi Gowda), a big fan of Siddharth proposes her love to him. He does not understand the seriousness of her craze for him and accepts her proposal just to hang around with her. Once at a mall along with Siddharth's band, he gets called to work. He informs Divya to go home as he has work to attend. Divya insists on going with him reasoning that since she is his girlfriend she should know about his work. Siddharth realizes that she had taken the relationship very seriously and admonishes her explaining that he did not want to get into a real relationship with her. He leaves her and goes away. She is lovelorn and commits suicide that night. Siddharth is depressed on realizing that he was the reason for her suicide decides never to get involved with girls.

Tanu's story- Siddharth narrates his Tanu experience to a friend who advises him to get her as he loves her. He goes back to her house only to find that she has left for Singapore.

And on this plane to Singapore he meets Adi. On reaching Singapore, Adi invites him home. Siddharth accepts the invitation and sets out to find Tanu. Meanwhile, Adi is getting married and invites Siddharth to his wedding. At the wedding Siddharth is shocked to see the bride, Tanu. Without another word, he leaves the wedding hall to the airport. On his way to the airport, he calls Adi to inform him that he has found his Tanu. But he requests Adi not to use his story and suggests he forget it. Adi agrees.

== Cast ==
- Sudeep as Siddharth
- Rajesh Nataranga as Adi
- Ramya as Nandini Appaiah "Tanu"
- M. G. Srinivas as Tanu's brother
- Arun Sagar as Raghav, Siddharth's bandmate
- Avinash as Tanu's father
- Keerthi Gowda as Divya
- Rangayana Raghu as actor on film set
- Sarovar Sanjeev as Divya's grandfather
- Bhuvann Ponnannaa as Siddharth's bandmate
- Yathiraj as Siddharth's bandmate
- Shailaja Joshi as Tanu's mother
- Anju Mahendra as Siddharth's bandmate
- Raghu Dixit (special appearance in "Munjaane Manjalli")

== Soundtrack ==
Just Maath Maathalli

Soundtrack album by Raghu Dixit
- Released: 2009
- Genre: Film soundtrack
- Label: Anand Audio
- Producer: R. Shankar

Raghu Dixit chronology
Quick Gun Murugun (2009)	Just Maath Maathalli (2009)	Kote (2011)

Raghu Dixit composed the music of Sudeep's Just Maath Maathalli. It was launched with many guests like Bollywood actor Vivek Oberoi, Tamil actor Silambarasan, and Telugu star Jagapathi Babu. The event also saw Ambareesh and producer Rockline Venkatesh on 18 December 2009 at Le Meridian, Bangalore.

This is the first Indian movie to have five title tracks. This is also the only Indian movie in which almost all the songs of the album are title tracks.

No.	Title	Lyrics	Singer(s)	Length
1.	"Just Maath Maatalli"	Kiran S. Vipra, Raghu Dixit	Raghu Dixit	02:36
2.	"Yello Jinugiruva"	Sudhir Attavar, Raghavendra Kamath	Shreya Ghoshal, Raghu Dixit	04:45
3.	"Munjaane Manjalli"	Raghavendra Kamath	Raghu Dixit, Haricharan	05:41
4.	"Ee Kanninalli"	Nandish Chandra	Raghu Dixit, Laxmi Manmohan	05:30
5.	"Baanina Haniyu"	Manojava Galgali	Raghu Dixit	02:45
6.	"Marubhoomiyalli"	Manojava Galgali, Raghu Dixit	Rajesh Krishnan	03:59

== Reception ==
=== Critical response ===
Shruti Indira Lakshminarayana of Rediff.com scored the film at 2.5 out of 5 stars and says "The narration technique and balance maintained between dialogues and visuals stand out. Sudeep is convincing as both a recluse and a popular singer. Ramya looks good and is a perfect foil for the introvert Sid. Rajesh, who plays the spirited Adi, does justice to his role. Arun Sagar and Avinash are also part of the cast. Costumes add zing to the characters and make them very relatable". A critic from Deccan Herald wrote "Till the drunken scene in the second half, there is enough momentum. The drunken philosophising risks getting people irritated, or fall in, full “fida”. The climax is a letdown to hardcore Sudeep fans. The film entertains nonetheless. Sri Venkat’s camera and Raghu Dixit’s music lend themselves to the director’s vision, embellishing the narration. Rohith and Sudeep excel". A critic from The Times of India Scored the film at 4 out of 5 stars wrote "While Sudeep excels as a singer and lover boy, Ramya, the `pakkadamane hudugi,' is charming with brilliant expressions and dialogue delivery and Rajesh is superb. Melodious numbers by Raghu Dixit are music to the ears and Venkat's pleasing camerawork is another highlight of the film".

== Accolades ==
Awards and nominations
Award	Wins	Nominations
Filmfare Awards South	0	3
Karnataka State Film Awards	2	0
Suvarna Film Awards	2	5 + N/A
- Totals
Awards won	4
Nominations	8 + N/A

58th Filmfare Awards South :-

- Filmfare Award for Best Actor - Kannada - Nominated - Sudeep
- Filmfare Award for Best Actress - Kannada - Nominated - Ramya
- Filmfare Award for Best Female Playback Singer - Kannada - Nominated - Shreya Ghoshal

Karnataka State Film Awards :-

- Best Sound Recording - Won - Kumar
- Best Female Voice Dubbing - Won - Deepu for the role of Ramya

Suvarna Film Awards :-

- Best Film - Nominated
- Best Director - Nominated - Sudeep
- Best Actor - Nominated - Sudeep
- Best Actress - Nominated - Ramya
- Favorite Heroine - Won - Ramya
- Best Lyricist - Won - Raghavendra Kamath for the song "Munjaane Manjalli"
- Favorite Song - Nominated - for the song "Munjaane Manjalli"
