= Minchina Ota (2008 film) =

- Directed by: A. M. R. Ramesh
- Produced by: S. R. Govind
- Starring: Vijay Raghavendra; Sriimurali; Lakshmi Rai
- Cinematography: P. Rajan
- Edited by: Anthony
- Music by: Songs: V. Manohar; Score: Dharma Vish
- Release date: 10 July 2008
- Running time: 138 min
- Country: India
- Language: Kannada

Minchina Ota (transl. Golden run) is a 2008 Kannada film directed by A. M. R. Ramesh. It stars Vijay Raghavendra, Sri Murali and Lakshmi Rai in the lead roles. The music was composed by V. Manohar and background score by Dharma Vish. The film released on 10 July 2008. The film is inspired by the 1971 film, Duel.

== Plot ==
The movie deals with Bhadra (Sriimurali) living in a slum, His group has rivalry with another group headed by Vijay (Vijay Raghavendra), a middle class guy, they both love a city girl (Raai Laxmi), their rivalry intensifies with the girl choosing Bhadra over Vijay. How things get on from there is the story.

== Cast ==
- Vijay Raghavendra as Vijay
- Sriimurali as Bhadra
- Raai Laxmi as girl from the city.
- Rangayana Raghu
- Umashree
- Suman
- Rahul Dev
- Vinayak Joshi
- Sudha Belawadi
- Mukhyamantri Chandru
- Tennis Krishna

== Soundtrack ==
The music was composed by V. Manohar and released by T-Series.

Minchina Ota

Soundtrack album by V. Manohar
- Released: 2008
- Recorded: 2008
- Genre: Soundtrack
- Length: 33:32
- Label: T-Series
- Producer: V. Manohar

V. Manohar chronology
Meravanige (2008)	Minchina Ota (2008)	Ganesha Matte Banda (2008)

Track list
No.	Title	Lyrics	Singer(s)	Length
1.	"We Love You Love Ganesh"	V. Manohar	Vijay Prakash, Rajesh Krishnan, Leelavathi	7:07
2.	"Oh Geleya"	Dharani	Raghu Dixit	2:46
3.	"Aa Moda Hani"	Chandru S. L.	Vijay Yesudas	3:02
4.	"Hey Huduga"	Chandru S. L.	M. D. Pallavi	3:25
5.	"Minchante Bandey"	Pradeep Kumar	Vijay Yesudas, Bhavatharini	5:21
6.	"Hey Premi"	Chandru S. L.	Raghu Dixit	2:41
7.	"Oh Mega Hogi Baa"	Chandru S. L.	Vijay Yesudas	2:41
8.	"Allondu Sanna Aase"	V. Manohar	Mangala Ravi	1:19
9.	"Jwaley Jwaley"	Gireesh Machalli	Vijay Prakash	2:25
10.	"Thangali Elli Baa"	Chandru S. L.	Lakshmi Manmohan	2:45
Total length:				33:32

== Reception ==
A critic from Deccan Herald wrote that "The narration is gripping, the chase leaves thriller buffs panting for more, the heroine gets to 'act', but pray, where is the story?" A critic from Rediff.com said that "Minchina Ota, despite competent performances from Vijaya Raghavendra and his brother Sree Murali, tests your patience".
