= Raghu Dixit =

Indian singer, composer, and producer

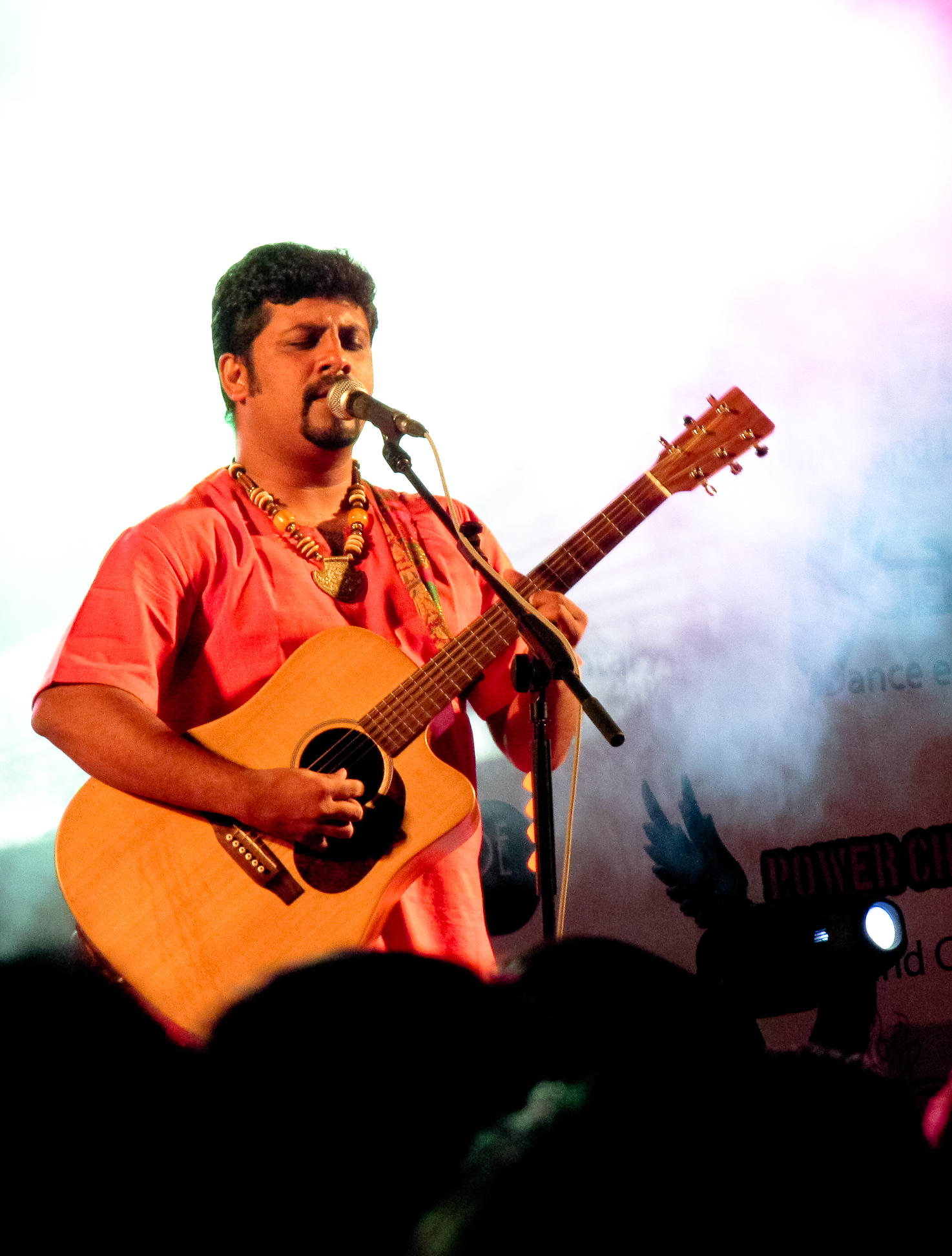
- Dixit performing at a concert, 2010
- Born: Raghupati Dwarakanath Dixit; 11 November 1974 (age 51); Nasik, Maharashtra, India
- Occupations: Singer, composer, singer-songwriter, music producer
- Years active: 2005–present
- Spouses: Mayuri Upadhya (m. 2005; div. 2019); Varijashree Venugopal (m. 2025)
- Website: raghudixit.com

Raghu Dixit as photographed in an audio release for the band Nee

Raghupati Dwarakanath Dixit (born 11 November 1974) is an Indian singer-composer, producer, and film score composer who is the frontman for the Raghu Dixit Project, a multilingual folk music band. Dixit prominently works in Kannada cinema as soundtrack composer.

Dixit's music is an amalgamation of Indian ethnic music and styles from different parts of the world. His songs include "Lokada Kalaji","Preetiya Hesare Neenu" "Alemaari" "Just Maath Maathalli" "Munjane Manjalli" "Gudugudiya" and "Ninna Poojege Bande Mahadeshwara" Dixit has produced music for contemporary dance and theatre productions including the Indian contemporary dance group Nritarutya, of which, his former wife Mayuri Upadhya, is the artistic director.

== Music ==
Dixit's self-titled debut album was launched by the music director duo Vishal–Shekhar on their new independent record label Vishal & Shekhar Music which collaborated with Counter Culture Records for this release. Raghu Dixit was the first artist on this new label. The album was also released on world music label Wrasse Records and Sony/ATV on 20 September 2010. The album reached No. 1 on the iTunes World Music charts in the UK. The title music for the show Splitsvilla was also composed and sung by Raghu Dixit. In the season one finale of The Dewarists, the Raghu Dixit Project collaborated with songwriter Rewben Mashangva on the song "Masti Ki Basti".

Collaborating with artists Dixit met during his previous concerts in the UK, the Raghu Dixit Project released their second studio album, Jag Changa. The album released on 23 November 2013. The album consists of eight tracks, in Kannada, Hindi and Tamil languages. In an interview with Vishnupriya Bhandaram of The Hindu, he mentions, "Every 200 kilometres in this country, languages change, the dialects change and the food changes, lives and lifestyles change and my music is unique and probably the USP is that it's sung in a vernacular tongue... its adds mystery."

== The Raghu Dixit Project ==
The Raghu Dixit Project is a multilingual folk-rock and world music band formed by Dixit in Bengaluru. Described as "an open house for musicians and artistes from different genres to come together, collaborate and create a dynamic sound", the group performs primarily in Kannada, Hindi, and Tamil, drawing on ancient Kannada poetry and Indian folk traditions fused with contemporary global influences.

The band's self-titled debut album was released in India in 2008 on Vishal–Shekhar's Vishal & Shekhar Music label in collaboration with Counter Culture Records, and internationally in September 2010 on Wrasse Records and Sony/ATV. The album reached number one on the iTunes World Music charts in the United Kingdom. Their second album, Jag Changa, was released on 23 November 2013. A third album, Shakkar, followed in 2024.

The Raghu Dixit Project won the Best Newcomer award at the Songlines Music Awards in 2011. The group has performed in over 30 countries across five continents.

In 2015, the band expanded from five to ten members for a new lineup that debuted at the NH7 Weekender in Pune.

=== Members ===
Current members

- Raghu Dixit – vocals, guitar
- Sanjay Kumar – guitars, bazouki
- Akshay Ganesh – violin
- Joe Jacob – drums
- Goutham Hebbar – flute, saxophone
- Naresh Nathan – bass

Former members

- Bryden Lewis – guitars (c. 2012–2015)
- Parth Chandiramani – flute (c. 2012–2015)
- Kavya Lakshminarayanan – trumpet (2015–)

Lewis and Chandiramani met while touring with the group in 2012 and later formed the composing duo Bryden-Parth.

== Films ==
In 2008, he debuted as a music director in the Kannada film industry with Psycho. He also composed and sang a song in the Bollywood movie Quick Gun Murugan. His new Kannada films, Just Math Mathalli and Kote, released soundtracks which were a big hit with audiences.

Dixit made his Bollywood debut with the film Mujhse Fraaandship Karoge in 2011. In 2013 he debuted in Malayalam recording with Bijibal for North 24 Kaatham.

== Concerts ==
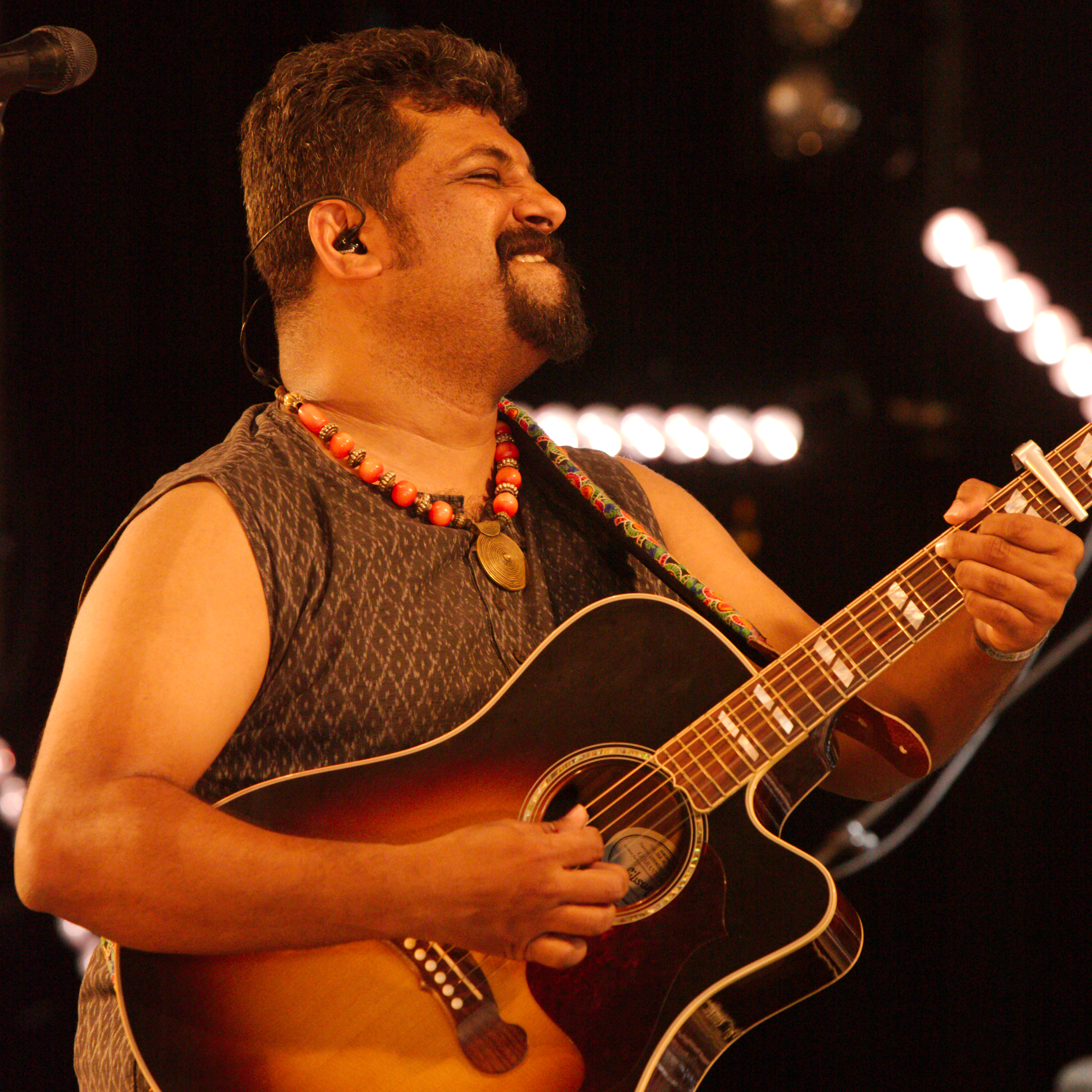
Raghu Dixit on stage at Shrewsbury Folk Festival 29 August 2016

Dixit has played many shows all over the world including in the United States, the UK, Korea, Japan, Russia, Hong Kong and India. He has performed at many music and cultural festivals, including Anwesha at IIT Patna, Alcheringa at IIT Guwahati, Incident at NITK-Surathkal, Aarohi at VNIT Nagpur, FIESTA at Infosys, the Glastonbury Festival, Mood Indigo, Jayciana at SJCE, Dhwani at College of Engineering Trivandrum, Spring Fest at IIT Kharagpur, MANZAR at Institute of Chemical Technology, the Shrewsbury Folk Festival, at the Sardar Patel Vidyalaya in New Delhi and at MVJ College of Engineering in Bangalore.

In 2010, he appeared on BBC TV's Later... with Jools Holland which led to one of his songs becoming an instant download hit, and since then he has made several appearances at festivals in the UK and in Europe. In the early months of 2011, he gave a concert as part of London South Bank's 'Alchemy' Festival. He also visited the Andrew Marr Show to perform "Waiting for a Miracle" for a Raghu Dixit Session on BBC Radio 3.

In April 2012, he performed for Queen Elizabeth II of the United Kingdom and Prince Philip, at a Diamond Jubilee Pageant marking 60 years since her accession to the throne in 1952.

In 2024, he performed at Bangalore Times concert. In 2024, he performed at the 2024 Summer Olympics.

== Personal life ==
Raghu Dixit was born on 11 November 1974 in Nasik, Maharashtra. His father was K. S. Dwarakanath, a Tamil Brahmin, and mother Malini, a Kannadiga. His only sibling is brother and musician Vasu Dixit. Raghu grew up in Mysore. He obtained a master's degree in microbiology from University of Mysore and worked briefly in the industry.

Dixit was first married to dancer Mayuri Upadhya from 2005 to 2019. In 2025, he married Varijashree Venugopal, a flutist.

Dixit was accused of hugging and kissing an unidentified singer after an ad hoc recording while he was signing her cheque, which was made public by Chinmayi Sripada, a friend of the singer, on 10 October 2018 on Twitter. In response, Dixit issued an apology on Twitter that same day that he completely misread the situation and that he would apologise to the singer again in public.

== Discography ==
=== As composer ===
Year	Film/album	Language	Notes
2008	Psycho	Kannada	
2009	Quick Gun Murugan	Hindi	One song
2010	Just Math Mathalli	Kannada	
2011	Kote	Kannada	
2011	Mujhse Fraaandship Karoge	Hindi	
2014	Bewakoofiyaan	Hindi	
2016	Aviyal	Tamil	One song
2017	Happy New Year	Kannada	
2017	Chef	Hindi	
2018	Koode	Malayalam	
2018	B. Tech	Telugu	ZEE5 Web Series
2019	Gully Boy	Hindi	One song; Composed along with MIDIval Punditz, Karsh Kale
2020	Garuda	Kannada	
2020	Love Mocktail	Kannada	
2021	Ninna Sanihake	Kannada	
2023	Vallavanukkum Vallavan	Tamil	
2023	Orchestra Mysuru	Kannada	
2023	Mandala: The UFO Incident	Kannada	

=== As playback singer ===
Year	Film/album	Language	Song	Music director
2008	Minchina Ota	Kannada	"Hey Premi" "Oh Geleya"	V. Manohar
2008	Psycho	Kannada	"Ee Tanavu Ninnade" "Preethiya Manshanthiya"	Himself
2009	Karanji	Kannada	"Ninna Hallige Bandu"	Veer Samarth
2009	Quick Gun Murugan	Hindi	"The Murugan Song"	Himself
2010	Just Math Mathalli	Kannada	"Munjane Manjalli" "Baanina Haniyu" "Ee Kanninalli" "Just Maath Maatalli"	Himself
2010	Shankar IPS	Kannada	"Sale Sale"	Gurukiran
2011	Kote	Kannada	"Yelavo Doorutha" "Jagave Banna Banna"	Himself
2011	Mujhse Fraaandship Karoge	Hindi	"Har Saans Mein"	Himself
2013	North 24 Kaatham	Malayalam	"Porumo"	Govind Menon
2013	Veera	Kannada	"Mahalu"	Hamsalekha
2013	Tony	Kannada	"Navu Kooguva"	Sadhu Kokila
2014	Bewakoofiyaan	Hindi	"Bewakoofiyaan Title Track"	Himself
2015	Siddhartha	Kannada	"Ninnida Dooraagi"	V. Harikrishna
2015	Son of Satyamurthy	Telugu	"Chal Chalo Chalo"	Devi Sri Prasad
2015	Srimanthudu	Telugu	"Jaago"	Devi Sri Prasad
2016	Badmaash	Kannada	"Hare Rama" "Rama Ravivara"	Judah Sandy
2016	1944	Kannada	"Prathi Yedeyalli"	Rajesh Ramnath
2016	Nannaku Prematho	Telugu	"Don't Stop"	Devi Sri Prasad
2016	Janatha Garage	Telugu	"Rock On Bro"	Devi Sri Prasad
2016	Aanandam	Malayalam	"Khule Rasthon Pe"	Sachin Warrier
2017	Beautiful Manasugalu	Kannada	"Soruthihudu Maneya Maligi"	Bharath BJ
2017	Trigger	Kannada	"Kannada"	Chandru Obaiah
2017	April Na Himabindu	Kannada	"Iduvarege Badukidella"	Bharath BJ
2017	Rajahamsa	Kannada	"Janaganamana"	Joshua Sridhar
2017	Happy New Year	Kannada	"Adda Bidde Madesha" "The Party Anthem"	Himself
2017	Chef	Hindi	"Shugal Laga De" "Darmiyaan"	Himself
2018	Tholi Prema	Telugu	"Break The Rules"	S. Thaman
2018	Koode	Malayalam	"Paranne"	Himself
2018	Gultoo	Kannada	"VTU We Love You"	Amit Anand
2018	Samhaara	Kannada	"Raakshasi"	Ravi Basrur
2018	Sankashta Kara Ganapathi	Kannada	"Sankashta Kara Ganapathi"	Ritvik Murulidhar
2018	Attempt To Murder	Kannada	"Pade Pade"	Ravidev; Jeet Singh
2018	Krishnarjuna Yudham	Telugu	"Urime Manase"	Hiphop Tamizha
2018	Imaikkaa Nodigal	Tamil	"Neeyum Naanum Anbe"	Hiphop Tamizha
2019	Gully Boy	Hindi	"The Train Song"	Himself along with MIDIval Punditz, Karsh Kale
2020	Arishadvarga	Kannada	"Gadiyaarake Muppirade"	Udit Haritas
2020	Love Mocktail	Kannada	"Oh! Oh! Love Aagoithalla" "Kanna Haniyondhu"	Himself
2021	Thimmarusu	Telugu	"The Thimmarusu"	Sricharan Pakala
2023	Orchestra Mysuru	Kannada	"Sulla Chandira"	Himself
2023	Orchestra Mysuru	Kannada	"Maadappa"	Himself
2026	Graamaayana	Kannada	"Shatha Shathamaanagalinda"	Poornachandra Tejaswi

== Filmography ==
Key
†	Denotes films that have not yet been released

Year	Film	Role	Notes	Ref
2008	Psycho	Guitarist	Uncredited appearance	
2010	Just Math Mathalli	Music director	Uncredited appearance	
2017	Chef	Himself	Hindi film; uncredited appearance	
2022	Raymo	Himself	Uncredited appearance	
2023	Orchestra Mysuru	Himself	Uncredited appearance	
2023	Baang	Daddy		

== Awards ==
- 2019 - Karnataka State Film Award for Best Male Playback Singer for the songs in Love Mocktail
- "Best Newcomer" at the 2011 Songlines Music Awards.
- Favorite Singer Award at the 2008 SFM Kalaa Awards
- Best Alternative Act at the UK Asian Music Awards
- Best Live Performer – GIMA Music Awards 2014
- Icon Award - Lokmat Sur Jyotsna National Music Award - 2026
