= Bettada Jeeva =

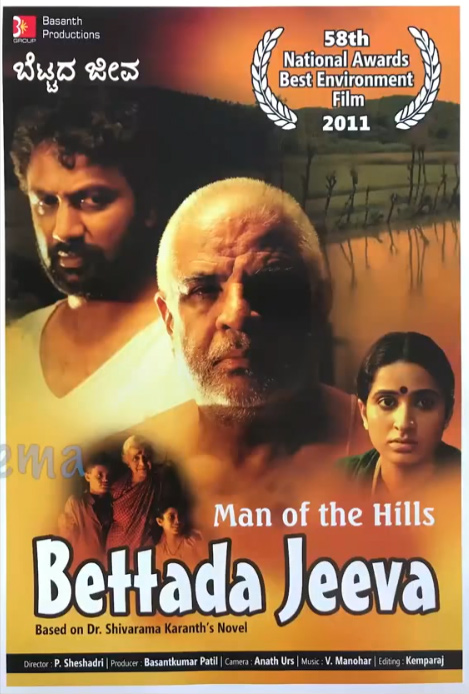
- Film Poster
- Directed by: P. Sheshadri
- Written by: K. Shivaram Karanth
- Based on: Bettada Jeeva by K. Shivaram Karanth
- Produced by: Basanta Kumar Patil
- Starring: H. G. Dattatreya; Suchendra Prasad; Rameshwari Varma
- Cinematography: Anant Urs
- Edited by: B. S. Kemparaju
- Music by: V. Manohar
- Distributed by: Basanth Productions
- Release date: 17 June 2011
- Country: India
- Language: Kannada

Bettada Jeeva is a National Award-winning (2011) Kannada film directed by P. Sheshadri starring H. G. Dattatreya, Suchendra Prasad, Rameshwari Varma and others. The story is based on Jnanpith awardee K. Shivaram Karanth's novel. It depicts the tradition of people living in remote areas of Western Ghats during pre-Independence days in India.

The movie was awarded the National Award for Best Film On Nature Conservation.

The collaboration between P. Shashadri and H. G. Dattatreya continued after several films. The pair would continue this stint in future films too.

== Story ==
The story happens in around early forties. A young freedom fighter Shivaramu, lost in jungle while he travels to a place near Subramanya, meets two villagers called Deranna and Bhatya. They advice Shivaramu to stay in the house of Gopalayya, a Brahmin living with his wife Shankaramma in Kelabailu. The couple treats Shivaramu well and asks him to stay for couple of more days. They express that their son Shambhu had left them years back. They treat Shivaramu as their own son.

During the stay, Gopalayya narrates the story of his past. Recalls his hardworking days of making a beautiful crop field beside mountain. Shivaramu slowly gets clear introduction to the legendary personality of Gopalayya. Shivaramu gets more curious at his attitude of fighting against nature to build his dreams in a place called Katumule. Meanwhile, Shivaramu meets Narayana, his wife Laxmi and their kids, living in Katumule. They feel that Shivaramu could be a person sent by Shambhu. Narayana also expresses that Shambhu's return may cause them to leave Katumule. So, Narayana plans to leave before that critical moment come and thinks of having his own land. Couple of days later Gopalayya says about his decision to transfer the property of Katumule to Narayana.

Later while talking to Shivaramu, everyone gives their own explanation for Shambhu's disappearance. Laxmi talks about an incident which could be the reason for leaving. Narayana describes Shambhu as a crooked minded. Gopalayya describes that opposing Shambhu's decision to join freedom movement may be the reason for him to leave the place. At the same time Shankaramma also blames herself to be the reason for his riddance. Each character explores their hidden feelings in their own way with Shivaramu.

Once Shivaramu finds Shambhu's photo and identifies him that he was also a comrade with him in freedom fighting, says he would try to find out Shambhu. When Shivaramu comes across an incident of villagers hunting a tiger, he requests and stops them from killing it. Finally he leaves the place Kelabailu, with a promise of finding Shambhu.

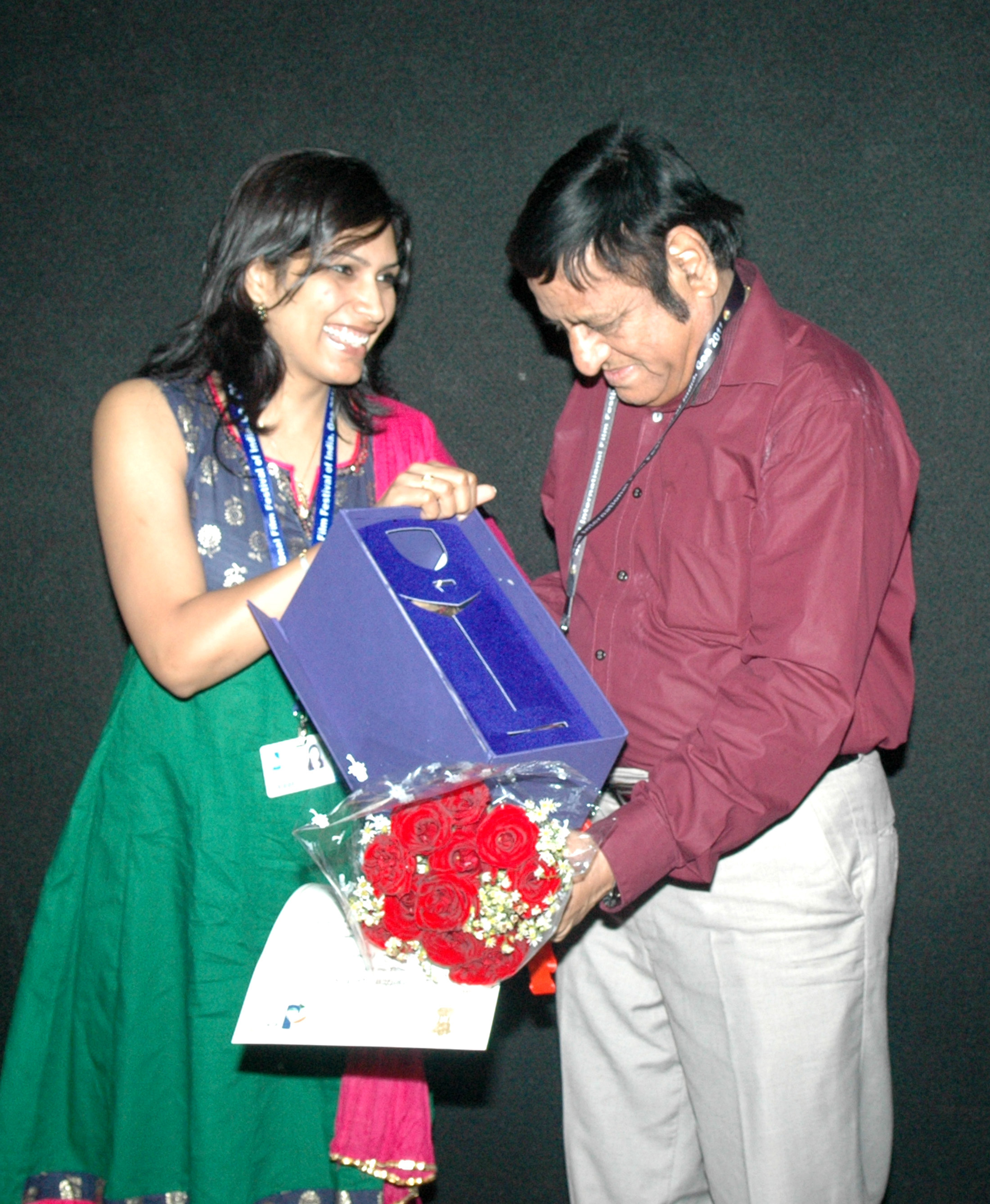
Film producer Basant K. Patil receiving felicitation, IFFI (2015)

== Cast ==
- H. G. Dattatreya as Gopalaiah
- Suchendra Prasad as Shivaramu
- Rameshwari Varma as Shankari
- Lakshmi Hegde

== Reception ==
=== Critical response ===
A critic from The Times of India scored the film at 4 out of 5 stars and says "Hats off to Suchendra Prasad for his dedicated portrayal of the revolutionary youth. Dattanna and Rameshwari Verma make an excellent pair. Lakshmi Hegde is impressive. Music by V Manohar is melodious and B S Kemperaju has done a neat editing job". A critic from News18 India wrote "'Bettada Jeeva' portrays the challenging and often beautiful life in the remote corners of the Western Ghats. It is certainly the best environmental film that has come in recent times and worthy of a national award". B S Srivani from Deccan Herald wrote "Gopalakrishna Pai’s dialogues, Manohar’s enchanting music and adequate editing by B S Kemparaju make Bettada Jeeva a compact, yet moving experience. Natural subtlety is the name of the game here. Bettada Jeeva offers complete enjoyment to those who have the time and temperament. Any takers?".

== Awards ==
- 2010 National Film Award: Best Film on Environment Conservation / Preservation
