= Krishnan Marriage Story =

2011 Indian Kannada-language romantic film

- Theatrical poster
- Directed by: Nuthan Ramesh
- Produced by: R. Vijaya Kumari
- Starring: Ajay Rao; Nidhi Subbaiah; Jai Jagadish
- Cinematography: Shekar Chandranna
- Edited by: Sri Crazymindz
- Music by: Sridhar V. Sambhram
- Production company: Crazymindz
- Release date: 15 July 2011
- Running time: 140 minutes
- Country: India
- Language: Kannada

Krishnan Marriage Story is an Indian Kannada-language romantic drama film written and directed by debutant Nuthan Umesh, starring Ajay Rao and Nidhi Subbaiah in the lead roles. Vijaya Kumar is the producer and Sridhar V. Sambhram is the music director of the film. The story revolves around the main lead character who plays an advertising executive and his large family.

== Plot ==
Krishna (Ajay Rao) is happy-go-lucky until his joint family search for a wife for him. He runs back to his grandmother's house after getting irritated by three brides. Where he meets Khushi (Nidhi Subbaiah). Later he discovers that she is his own childhood friend. Both fall in love. Their families also accept for their marriage. And they get married. Khushi always loved a joint family and looks Krishna's family as her own relatives. But one day everybody learn from Krishna that Khushi is in last stage of a disease and cannot be saved. He reveals that he knew it before their marriage when a doctor discovered it when they were in her village. His family cryingly decide not reveal it to Khushi and keep her happy until she dies. On her birthday's evening, she is on her deathbed. Khushi reveals that she knew about her disease since one of their family's child came and gave her a gift since she was about to die.

Years later, on Khushi's birthday, she comes along with her little daughter and Krishna reveals that she had survived by the love for and by his family.

== Cast ==
- Ajay Rao as Krishna
- Nidhi Subbaiah as Khushi
- Jai Jagadish as Krishna's father
- Balaraj as Krishna's uncle
- Vinaya Prasad as Krishna's mother
- Shille Manjunath
- Bhargavi Narayan
- Sangeetha as Krishna's aunt
- Nagendra Shah as Parameshwarappa, Khushi's father
- Swayamvara Chandru as Chandru
- Suresh Mangalore as Rajashekhar
- Sri (Crazy Mindz)
- Sandhyashree as Sandhya
- Anushree Bhat as Anushree
- Harshika Poonacha as a prospective bride (cameo)
- Priyanka Chandra as a prospective bride (cameo)
- Karunya Ram as a prospective bride (cameo)

== Music ==
Krishnan Marriage Story

Soundtrack album by Sridhar V. Sambhram
- Released: 2011
- Recorded: 2011
- Genre: Feature film soundtrack
- Length: 25:05
- Language: Kannada

Official audio
- Krishnan Marriage Story - Full Album on YouTube

Track listing
No.	Title	Singer(s)	Length
1.	"Nidde Bandhillaa"	Mika Singh, Nandita, Chaitra, Anuradha Bhat	4:46
2.	"Ee Sanje"	Sonu Nigam, Anuradha Bhat	3:43
3.	"Ayyoo Raam Raama"	Harsha Sadananda, Akansha Badami, Apoorva Sridhar	4:06
4.	"Parijathada"	Lakshmi Manmohan, Rajesh Krishnan	4:29
5.	"My Heart Is Beating"	Santhosh Venki	4:08
6.	"Ee Janmavu Ondhe Saladhu"	Sonu Nigam, Shreya Ghoshal	4:33
Total length:			25:05

== Reception ==
=== Critical response ===
A critic from The Times of India scored the film at 4 out of 5 stars and says "Full marks to Ajai Rao for his brilliant performance. Nidhi Subbaiah impresses with her lively portrayal. The plus point of the movie is brilliant cinematography by Shekha Chandra. It's complete 'Sambhrama' in music by Sridha V Sambhram. Manju Mandvya has some catchy dialogues for you". A critic from DNA wrote "especially with their emotional scenes and the artiste who dubbed for Nidhi for the climax is quite a disappointment. Directors, who have cast actors who have a good hold on Kannada, should let them dub for themselves to keep their characters alive. This is the best example of how bad dubbing can spoil a good scene". B S Srivani from Deccan Herald wrote "Krishnan Marriage Story may bore the pants off some people, but scores with its neat presentation and for promoting family values in an increasingly cynical society". A critic from Bangalore Mirror wrote "Acting wise, Ajay Rao, Nidhi Subbaiah and others have done their best. For a change, we have a movie which shows happiness and brings happiness for those watching. It is definitely worth trying once".
