= The Local Train =

Hindi alternative indie rock band

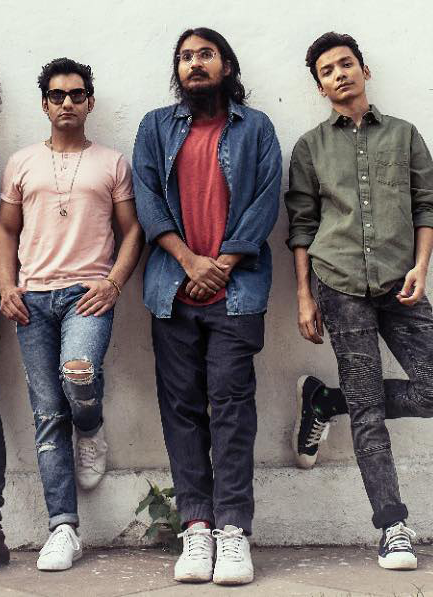
- The Local Train

Background information
- Origin: Chandigarh, India
- Genres: Pop rock, Alternative Rock
- Years active: 2008–present (18 years)
- Label: Independent
- Members: Paras Thakur; Ramit Mehra; Sahil Sarin
- Past members: Anand Sharma; Abhinav Bansal; Raman Negi

The Local Train is an Indian rock band formed in Chandigarh in 2008, and based in New Delhi since 2015. The band's current lineup consists of lead guitarist and vocalist - Paras Thakur, bassist - Ramit Mehra, and drummer and percussionist - Sahil Sarin. In April 2022, the band announced that their vocalist / frontman Raman Negi has left the band.

Having started their career by releasing a stream of singles, the band's debut album, Aalas Ka Pedh, was released in 2015 and their second album, Vaaqif, followed in 2018. Both the albums have been among the top 5 most-streamed rock music albums on Apple Music India. The band is known for its Hindi and Urdu lyrics, often touching on topics like communalism and faith.

The Local Train frequently performs at live events and music festivals in India. They performed at Bacardi NH7 Weekender, SULAFEST, One Plus Music Fest, Red Bull Tour Bus, Grub Fest and Sympulse Fest. Their music has been featured in Pan Nalin's 2015 film Angry Indian Goddesses, which premiered at the Toronto International Film Festival.

== Band members ==
- Paras Thakur – Lead & Acoustic Guitar, Vocals
- Ramit Mehra – Bass Guitar
- Sahil Sarin – Drums, Percussion

Past Members

- Anand Sharma - Guitarist, Vocals
- Raman Negi – Lyrics, Vocals, Acoustic Guitar
- Abhinav Bansal - Acoustic Guitar
- Abhinish Goinjihar – Acoustic Guitar

== History ==
=== Early years ===
The Local Train began in Chandigarh in 2008 when Ramit, who was working in radio, theatre and performing with several local bands, collaborated with Raman on a song. Soon after, Ramit introduced Raman to Sahil, a well-known independent musician and educator in the circuit, who had known Ramit since their school days and they formed The Local Train. In 2011, Paras joined the band, replacing Abhinav, and dropped out of his civil engineering course. In 2012, Raman quit his job at TCS to pursue music full time and the band relocated to Delhi. Throughout this period, they functioned independently; they handled the management and logistics while simultaneously working on songs and releasing them online. Their single "Choo Lo" was released on MySpace in 2009 and continued to be refined until its music video release in 2011. Other singles released then include "Aaoge Tum Kabhi" and "Kaisey Jiyun" in 2014.

=== 2015–2016 ===
The Local Train had recorded most of their debut album, Aalas Ka Pedh, when they won Sennheiser's first Top50 band talent hunt in India in 2015, bagging an endorsement from Sennheiser. They finished the album, which contained two of their previously released singles, and released it with Flying Carpet Productions in September 2015. The album was mastered by Chris Hesse and was one of the highest selling Indian rock albums of the year, featuring on the “Most Streamed Rock Albums'' list on Apple Music India. In November 2015 they signed on with Spectal Management.

The Local Train worked extensively with The Morpheus Productions for their initial music videos. The first video was for "Aaoge Tum Kabhi", which featured in Pan Nalin's 2015 film Angry Indian Goddesses that premiered at The Toronto International Film Festival. Their second music video for Kaise Jiyun featured a performance by choreographer Ryan Martyr. The Dil Mere video was shot in Solang Valley and Manali, and was produced by Snow Leopard Productions, and Atharva Studios.

=== 2017–present ===
The Local Train released Khudi in 2017, a single from their second album. Its music video starred Arjun Mathur, was directed by Vijesh Rajan and produced by Jungle Book Entertainment. It won Platinum Film of The Year at the 2017 India Film Project Awards. The second album Vaaqif was released in January 2018, with mixing and mastering done by Erich Talaba. The band toured extensively in 21 cities before the album launch. In 2018, they released Mizaaj's music video, their first foray into animation that was conceptualized and animated by Ekabhuya Animation. A cyber-punk themed animated video for Gustaakh soon followed, produced by Plexus studios and edited by Shreyas Beltangdy. It was selected for the 18th Miami International Science Fiction Film Festival, and chosen as one of Rolling Stone’s 11 best Indian music videos for 2019.

The band has posted on their Instagram channel to confirm about the release of a third album.

In April 2022, it was revealed that vocalist Raman Negi had left the band in December 2021. However, the band reported they will continue making music. Raman Negi released his debut solo album, Shaksiyat, later that year.

The band collaborated with Lucky Ali in 2024 on Tu Hai Kahaan for Shirsha Guha Thakurta's "Do Aur Do Pyaar".

In late 2024 and early 2025, The Local Train hinted at working on new material for future release, with the band sharing on their official social media accounts that they were recording and preparing fresh music to follow their 2024 singles. As of early 2026, the band has not yet announced an official release date for new songs or albums.

== Style and themes ==
The Local Train’s music uses a blend of Urdu and Hindi lyrics, and has been described as soulful, evocative, and anthemic. The band cites their musical influences to include Nirvana, Aerosmith, U2, Porcupine Tree, Lucky Ali, The 1975, and Alt-J. They have expressed a desire to “put the Hindi in the indie”, and to make a mark on audiences looking to switch from mainstream Bollywood to other genres of music.

While Aalas ka Pedh was more pop-rock inclined, showing the evolution of the band's music, the band started to experiment with larger themes in their second album Vaaqif. The tracks and accompanying videos explore diverse topics and stories including those about communalism, faith, existentialism, self-actualisation, over-dependence on technology, and oppressive regimes.

== Tours and live shows ==
=== Music festivals ===
- Falcon Festival, Dima Hasao, Assam(2021)
- Grubfest (2017)
- Bacardi NH7 Weekender (2017, 2018)
- Bacardi NH7 Weekender Express (Jaipur 2018, Chandigarh 2018)
- Red Bull Bus Tour (2018)
- OnePlus Festival (2019).
- Udaipur World Music Festival (2019)
- He Ha Story (2019)
- Repertwahr festival (2019)
- SULA fest (2020)

=== Tours ===
- 7 City Summer Tour (2018)
- 7 City Summer Tour (2019)

=== College festivals ===
The band has performed at colleges in more than 90 cities across India including

- Confluence 2016, NIT Kurukshetra

Rajiv Gandhi Institute Of Petroleum Technology [Kaltarang 2018 ]

- Kashiyatra 2017 IIT (BHU) Varanasi
- Synapse 2017 & Synapse 2018 DA-IICT (Dhirubhai Ambani Institute of Information and Communication Technology), Gandhinagar
- TechNITi 2019 National Institute of Technology Jalandhar
- Shaheed Sukhdev College of Business Studies, University of Delhi
- Vivacity 2015, 2018 The LNM Institute of Information Technology, Jaipur
- HILLFFAIR 2016, 2019 National Institute of Technology, Hamirpur
- Indian Institute of Science Education and Research, Pune
- Indian Statistical Institute, Kolkata
- Indian Institute of Technology, Hyderabad
- Indian Institute of Technology, Delhi
- Indian Institute of Technology, (Indian School of Mines), Dhanbad
- AARUUSH 2018, SRM Institute of Science and Technology
- Breeze 2018, Shiv Nadar University
- Effervescence 2018, Indian Institute of Information Technology, Allahabad
- Waves 2019, BITS Goa
- Kaalrav 2018, Sikkim Manipal Institute of Technology
- Espektro 2020, Kalyani Government Engineering College
- Ingenium 2018, Ahmedabad University
- Odyssey 2017, Indraprastha Institute of Information Technology, Delhi
- MAFFICK 2019, MANIT Bhopal
- VIT Bhopal 2019
- Symbiosis Jaipur 2019
- Recstacy 2019, National Institute of Technology, Durgapur
- NITRUTSAV 2016, National Institute of Technology, Rourkela
- Flare 2018, Pandit Deendayal Petroleum University

=== Other shows ===
The band has performed at venues including Hard Rock Cafe, Farzi Cafe, Flea Bazaar Cafe, Fandom Bangalore, and Phoenix Market City.

== Discography ==
Aalas Ka Pedh (transl. The tree of laziness)

Released on 25 September 2015.

No.	Title	Length
1.	"Manzil"	4:20
2.	"Aaoge Tum Kabhi"	4:13
3.	"Bandey"	5:05
4.	"Choo Lo"	3:53
5.	"Kaise Jiyun"	3:59
6.	"Yeh Zindagi Hai"	4:09
7.	"Dil Mere"	3:31
8.	"Kaise Jiyun (Acoustic)"	3:39
9.	"Yeh Zindagi Hai (Demo)"	4:20

Vaaqif (transl. Aware)

Released on 19 January 2018.

No.	Title	Length
1.	"Gustaakh"	3:04
2.	"Dilnawaz"	3:27
3.	"Khudi"	4:57
4.	"Aaftab"	3:53
5.	"Mere Yaar"	4:46
6.	"Mizaaj"	4:23
7.	"Aakhri Salam"	4:37
8.	"Vaaqif"	6:20

=== Film ===
- In 2024, The Local Train contributed to the soundtrack of the film Do Aur Do Pyaar, composing and writing the song "Tu Hai Kahan", which was performed by Lucky Ali. The song marked a notable collaboration between the band and the singer, and was featured in the film starring Vidya Balan and Pratik Gandhi.
