= Ashtray Maze =

Level sequence in the 2019 video game Control

- Screenshot of Jesse traversing the Ashtray Maze, where its walls cascade and guide the player along.
- First appearance: Control (2019)

In-universe information
- Character: Jesse Faden

The Ashtray Maze is a fictional location and level in the 2019 action-adventure game Control, developed by Remedy Entertainment. Located within the Oldest House, the headquarters of the fictional Federal Bureau of Control, the maze initially appears as an impassable series of corridors which continually rearrange themselves. Late in the game, protagonist Jesse Faden is able to traverse it while listening to "Take Control", a song by the fictional band Old Gods of Asgard, performed by Finnish rock band Poets of the Fall. As Jesse fights enemies, the surrounding walls, floors and passageways repeatedly move and transform.

Remedy developed the sequence for almost a year. Game director Mikael Kasurinen said that its apparent complexity was achieved without being particularly technically complicated, and that the developers abandoned an earlier plan to accompany the sequence with tango music in favor of "Take Control". The Ashtray Maze was singled out by critics following the game's release; GameSpot selected it as one of its editorial highlights of 2019, while The Escapist devoted an episode of its The Joy of Gaming series to what it called the year's best gaming moment. The level has also been examined in architectural criticism for its use of compression and expansion of space. Following release of Control, players discovered methods of bypassing it while speedrunning the game, as well as a hidden message within "Take Control" that was subsequently connected to the game's AWE expansion.

== Content ==
The Ashtray Maze is situated in the Research Sector of the Oldest House. The player encounters it before it can be traversed: apparently straightforward corridors alter their layout when Jesse approaches them, with passages closing and new ones opening until she is ultimately returned to the entrance. This effectively make any attempts to navigate the maze logically futile, since it continuously redirects the player regardless of the route taken.

Near the end of the game, the Oldest House's janitor, Ahti, gives Jesse a cassette player and headphones that allow her to pass through the maze. "Take Control", credited in the game to the fictional Old Gods of Asgard and performed by Poets of the Fall, plays as Jesse proceeds through it. Rather than continuing to obstruct her, the surrounding architecture would now repeatedly open a route forward: hallways divide or rotate, surfaces move around Jesse, and enclosed spaces expand into combat areas populated by the Hiss, turning what had initially appeared to be a puzzle into a set piece in which the alterations to the environment accompany Jesse's combat encounters and the music.

== Development ==
Remedy experimented with the sequence's musical accompaniment during development. Game director Mikael Kasurinen said that the team originally considered using a tango before deciding that a metal song by Old Gods of Asgard suited the maze better. He regarded the addition of the music as the element that elevated the sequence into something distinctive. "Take Control" was written specifically for Control and performed by Poets of the Fall under their recurring Old Gods of Asgard identity. Audio director Justin Andree later described his work on the game's music as involving both whether individual songs fitted their intended scenes and the practical costs involved in securing or producing them.

In a 2019 interview with GamesRadar, Kasurinen said the Ashtray Maze was not especially difficult to implement from a technical standpoint. He instead attributed its apparent complexity to the work of Remedy's designers and artists, who used the changing environment to create what he described as a sense of far greater complexity than was actually involved. Kasurinen said that staff worked on the sequence for almost a year.

In a feature by GameSpot which is devoted to the creation of the level, Kasurinen presented early concepts for the sequence and discussed its visual influences, the challenge Remedy set itself in constructing it, and the role of music in the finished version. GameSpot writer Tamoor Hussain characterized the final effect as resembling a stage illusion: apparently complicated environmental transformations were produced using comparatively straightforward underlying techniques.

== Reception and legacy ==
The Ashtray Maze was frequently singled out by video game journalists as one of the most memorable sequences in Control. In GameSpot's Best Games of 2019 feature, Peter Brown described the sequence as one of the game's standout moments, comparing its shifting architecture to the Overlook Hotel from The Shining and highlighting how the environment expands, contracts, and changes around the player. In another GameSpot feature, the sequence was selected as an editor highlight for 2019, with Brown praising its transformation from an initially impassable maze into a choreographed combat encounter. Nate Najda devoted an episode of The Escapist's The Joy of Gaming series to the Ashtray Maze, identifying it as one of his favourite gaming moments of 2019 and discussing the sequence as an example of the strengths of Control's design.

Matt Cox of Rock Paper Shotgun gave a more mixed assessment, writing that the Ashtray Maze represented Control "at its best and worst". Cox described the sequence as the point where his initial frustration with the game gave way to enthusiasm, particularly when it transformed into a music-video-like set piece. He praised the way the maze manipulated player expectations, describing the disappearing walls, psychedelic music, and enemies seemingly controlled by an unseen force as examples of "stupid yet genius design decisions". However, he also criticised the repeated combat encounters, arguing that the sequence exposed what he viewed as broader problems with Control's combat, which he felt became repetitive despite its visual spectacle.

The Ashtray Maze has also received retrospective recognition for its visual design. Architectural writer Jullia Joson discussed the Ashtray Maze in ArchDaily as an example of the architectural principle of compression and expansion in virtual spaces. She described its narrow corridors as funneling the player forward before the surrounding space progressively expands. Joson contrasted that compression with the larger interconnected spaces elsewhere in Control, arguing that the game's architecture accommodates Jesse's range of movement abilities, including running, throwing objects and levitation. GamingBolt included it among its list of the "11 Most Graphically Amazing Video Game Levels", highlighting the sequence's shifting environments, lighting effects, and surreal presentation as an example of the visual possibilities of modern video games.

The Ashtray Maze became an early target for players attempting to complete Control as quickly as possible. Within weeks of the game's release, speedrunners had discovered an out-of-bounds technique that allowed them to bypass almost the entire sequence. Aron Garst of PC Gamer reported that completing the maze normally took nearly six minutes, while the skip reduced that portion of a run to about one minute by allowing the player to travel outside its intended geometry. Remedy developers expressed surprise at the method, while community manager Vida Starčević said that the studio enjoyed seeing players find ways of breaking the game.

"Take Control" also contained a hidden message connected to later Control content. Portions of the song contain reversed speech, which players discovered soon after release but were initially unable to interpret as instructions leading to anything within the game. Following the release of AWE in 2020, players determined that elements of the message referred to a puzzle added by the expansion, which led to an Easter egg and an in-game item. GameSpot described the message as one of Control's most persistent unresolved secrets before the expansion supplied its solution.

The sequence continued to be used in later discussion of music created specifically for video games. In 2023, PCGamesN returned to the Ashtray Maze while interviewing Andree about the use of fictional bands and bespoke songs within game worlds. The publication identified "Take Control" and the Ashtray Maze as one of Control's most prominent musical sequences, while Andree discussed in-universe performers as a means of integrating music more directly into fictional settings.
