= Control downloadable content =

Downloadable content for the 2019 video game Control

The 2019 action-adventure video game Control, developed by Remedy Entertainment and published by 505 Games, received several pieces of downloadable content following its release. Remedy's post-release programme included the free Photo Mode and Expeditions updates and two paid story expansions, The Foundation and AWE.

The Foundation, released in March 2020 for PlayStation 4 and Windows and in June for Xbox One, continues the game's main storyline as protagonist Jesse Faden investigates the foundations of the Oldest House and the origins of the Federal Bureau of Control's relationship with the Board. It introduces a new area, enemies and abilities based around manipulating crystalline formations. Critics generally regarded it as a worthwhile continuation of Control, praising its world-building and combat while differing over its cave environments, new mechanics and limited resolution of the game's mysteries.

AWE was released in August 2020 and crosses over with Remedy's earlier game Alan Wake. Set primarily within the Federal Bureau of Control's abandoned Investigations Sector, it incorporates characters, concepts and gameplay elements from Alan Wake while continuing Jesse's story. Its reception was mixed to positive, with particular praise for the atmosphere and integration of the two games, though critics frequently considered the expansion too short or more successful as a preview of Remedy's future stories than as a self-contained conclusion.

The two expansions and previously released updates were later bundled with the base game in Control Ultimate Edition. Remedy subsequently identified AWE as the first official crossover in what it termed the "Remedy Connected Universe", and later coverage of Alan Wake 2 retrospectively identified the expansion as an important narrative bridge between the two franchises.

== Development and release ==
Remedy announced its post-launch roadmap for Control in September 2019. The developer planned a free Photo Mode for later that year, the free Expeditions game mode in December, and two story expansions for 2020. The first, The Foundation, was described as exploring the history of the Oldest House, while the second, AWE, would open the previously inaccessible Investigations Sector, where the Federal Bureau of Control investigated Altered World Events. Both story expansions were included in a US$24.99 Expansion Pass.

The promotional artwork for AWE prompted speculation that it would involve Alan Wake, whose events had already been referenced in documents and Easter eggs in the base game. Game director Mikael Kasurinen said in December 2019 that some of the secrets placed in Control were intended to have a longer development across its expansions. In May 2020, creative director Sam Lake confirmed that Remedy had deliberately been developing the idea that Alan Wake and Control occupied the same setting and said that the second expansion would reveal more about the Bureau's investigation of the events at Bright Falls.

The Foundation was released for PlayStation 4 and Windows on March 26, 2020. The Windows version was distributed through the Epic Games Store. The expansion was initially unavailable on Xbox One as part of a timed exclusivity arrangement and was released for that platform on June 25. It cost US$14.99 separately. Remedy later acknowledged player frustration with the staggered release and announced that AWE would instead launch on all platforms simultaneously.

Remedy formally confirmed the Alan Wake crossover in August 2020. Lake described Altered World Events as incidents in which paranatural forces breach ordinary reality, while the expansion's setting was the sealed Investigations Sector formerly used by the Bureau to investigate them. Remedy simultaneously began publicly describing Control and Alan Wake as components of the "Remedy Connected Universe". Lake said the studio had been working toward the concept of interconnected stories for more than a decade and described AWE as its first official crossover event.

AWE was released on August 27, 2020, the first anniversary of Control's release, for PlayStation 4, Xbox One and Windows. It was priced at US$14.99 separately and was also included in the Expansion Pass. .

== The Foundation ==
The Foundation is set after completion of Control's main campaign and is accessed through the Hotline Chamber in Central Executive. It introduces the Foundation, a large cave system beneath the conventional sectors of the Oldest House, with areas that intersect with the Astral Plane.

=== Gameplay ===
The expansion adds two abilities involving crystalline formations found in the Foundation. Shape enables Jesse to extend crystals from predetermined surfaces, creating platforms for traversal or spikes that can be used against enemies. Fracture modifies the Service Weapon so that Jesse can destroy formations blocking passages or supporting enemies. Players initially select one of the abilities and later acquire the other, allowing previously inaccessible sections of the Foundation to be explored.

Combat makes use of the same environmental formations, allowing players to create crystalline cover or impale enemies and to destroy surfaces beneath opponents. The Foundation also introduces the Hiss Sharpened, a fast melee-oriented enemy capable of rapidly approaching Jesse and evading attacks. A free update released alongside the expansion added Shield Rush, which allows Jesse to use her Shield ability offensively by charging into enemies, as well as an improved map, the ability to reassign ability points and other quality-of-life changes for all players. The expansion contains three side missions alongside its central storyline. One, "Jesse Faden Starring in 'Swift Platform'", places Jesse on a sequence of moving platforms while pursuing an Altered Item and fighting enemies. Reviewers estimated that its primary and side missions took approximately four to six hours to complete.

=== Plot ===
The Board summons Jesse to the Foundation, a cavernous area at the center of the Oldest House that houses the Nail, an object that connects the Oldest House to the Astral Plane. Jesse finds the Nail has been seriously damaged, causing the Astral Plane to leak into the Oldest House with potentially catastrophic consequences. As Jesse attempts to restore the Nail, she seeks the whereabouts of Helen Marshall, who entered the Foundation during the Hiss invasion and has gone missing. Meanwhile, Jesse discovers logs left behind by Theodore Ash, Jr., the former Head of Research who in 1964 was part of the first expeditions to the Oldest House. Ash reveals Broderick Northmoor, the director who preceded Trench, fell under the Board's influence during the expedition and was responsible for radically changing the Bureau in order to serve the Board's interests.

As Jesse continues to restore the Nail, she encounters Former, an extradimensional entity that grants Jesse a new ability, enraging the Board. Former claims to have once been a member of the Board who was blamed for an unknown transgression then exiled. Torn between the two entities, Jesse is eventually able to restore the Nail, but tremors occur between the Oldest House and the Astral Plane, threatening to destroy both dimensions. Jesse reaches the base of the Nail, where she finds Marshall possessed by the Hiss. With Former's aid, Jesse kills Marshall and cleanses the Nail. Jesse learns Marshall had damaged the Nail as a preventative measure against both the Hiss and the Board. Marshall's HRA was destroyed soon after, an act Marshall believed retaliation by the Board, allowing her to be possessed by the Hiss. With the crisis averted but having lost faith in the Board, Jesse vows to lead the Bureau her own way.

=== Reception ===
Reception

Aggregate scores
Aggregator	Score
Metacritic	PC: 77/100; PS4: 78/100; XONE: 78/100
OpenCritic	79%

Review scores
Publication	Score
Destructoid	7/10
WorthPlaying	8/10

The Foundation received generally favorable reviews. Metacritic recorded scores of 77 out of 100 for Windows and 78 for both PlayStation 4 and Xbox One, while OpenCritic recorded a top critic average of 79 out of 100.

Critics frequently characterized the expansion as an extension of the strengths and weaknesses of Control rather than a substantial reinvention. Phil Hornshaw of GameSpot considered the increased interaction with the environment a meaningful addition to combat, particularly because Shape and Fracture encouraged players to consider enemy positioning and the terrain around them. He nevertheless found that neither ability fundamentally changed Jesse's established combat strategies. Ben Reeves of Game Informer was less impressed, regarding the new abilities and repeated objectives as insufficient to distinguish the expansion from the base game. He particularly criticized its reliance on combat encounters and what he considered a fetch-quest structure.

The Foundation itself received a divided response as a setting. Carolipio found its caves less visually and psychologically compelling than the shifting bureaucratic environments of the Oldest House, although he considered the atmosphere recognizably consistent with Control and praised the quantity of environmental storytelling and optional discoveries. Brett Makedonski of Destructoid similarly found the expansion uneven, describing two of its four principal areas as strong and the other two as comparatively sparse. He nevertheless continued to enjoy searching the environment for research documents and recordings that expanded the game's mythology.

The expansion's story attracted particular attention for developing the relationship between Jesse, the Board and the Former. Hornshaw considered the revelations concerning the Bureau's discovery of the Oldest House and the growing uncertainty surrounding the Board a meaningful continuation of the game's story. Makedonski instead felt that The Foundation raised important questions about the Board and Former without sufficiently exploring their conflict, leaving the expansion feeling ultimately inconsequential despite the additional lore. Carolipio similarly questioned its lasting narrative impact, describing it as entertaining but a comparatively small step forward for the setting.

Megan Crouse of Den of Geek analysed the expansion principally in terms of Jesse's development as Director. She argued that The Foundation makes Jesse increasingly confident in her authority while simultaneously giving her greater reason to distrust the supernatural structure that appointed her. Crouse viewed Jesse's willingness to challenge the Board and cooperate with the Former as part of a developing attempt to break with the patterns established by previous FBC directors, although she considered the expansion too short to fully resolve those political and supernatural conflicts. Redmond Carolipio of WorthPlaying singled out the gameplay of "Swift Platform" as possibly the expansion's strongest individual sequence, comparing its combination of music, movement and combat to the Ashtray Maze from the base game.

== AWE ==
AWE is a crossover between Control and Remedy Entertainment's previous game Alan Wake, which takes place in Bright Falls, Washington, United States. In that game, writer Alan Wake is coerced and trapped by a Dark Presence that inhabits the town's Cauldron Lake, a dimension that is able to turn works of art into reality.

=== Gameplay ===
AWE becomes available before the end of the main campaign and opens the Investigations Sector, a portion of the Oldest House that had been sealed following a containment failure. It retains Control's combination of telekinetic abilities and firearm combat while incorporating a recurring light-and-darkness mechanic derived from Alan Wake. Several encounters require Jesse to restore or transport sources of light before she can damage creatures protected by supernatural darkness. The expansion adds Surge, a Service Weapon form that fires explosive projectiles which adhere to surfaces and can be remotely detonated. A free update released alongside AWE also introduced Multi-Launch, an upgrade allowing Jesse to seize and throw several objects simultaneously.

Altered arcade machines located in the Investigations Sector provide repeatable challenge modes. One allows previously completed boss encounters and the Ashtray Maze sequence to be replayed, while another provides a horde-style combat mode. Completing arcade challenges provides additional rewards, including an outfit.

The accompanying August update also altered the difficulty and checkpoint systems throughout the base game. Remedy placed additional Control Points near several boss encounters, added intermediate checkpoints intended to reduce repeated combat, and introduced Assist Mode, which lets players independently modify variables such as incoming and outgoing damage or enable options including immortality.

=== Plot ===
Following the events of Alan Wake (as described in Control), FBC agents confronted and arrested Emil Hartman, a psychologist who attempted to investigate and exploit this power, and confiscate his research on the lake. In a final act of desperation, Hartman dove into Cauldron Lake and was possessed by the Dark Presence. Hartman was subsequently captured and taken to the Oldest House by the Bureau, who attempted to contain him in the Investigations Sector. After Hartman breached containment, the Bureau was forced to abandon and seal off almost all of the sector. During the Hiss invasion, the Hiss mixed with the Dark Presence in Hartman, twisting him into a monstrous entity that haunts the sector.

An apparition of Alan Wake, who is otherwise considered missing, summons Jesse to the Investigations Sector. She encounters Hartman, and Frederick Langston warns her Hartman cannot be allowed to escape the sector. Jesse attempts to traverse the Investigations Sector and destroy Hartman, and receives visions of Alan, revealing he was responsible for writing Hartman's escape into existence using Cauldron Lake's power to influence reality using works of art. Alan also implies his writing helped cause the Hiss invasion to create a "crisis" for his "hero", Jesse, as part of his attempt to escape from Cauldron Lake. Jesse reaches the Bright Falls AWE area of the Investigations Sector and destroys Hartman. Langston informs Jesse of a newly detected AWE in Bright Falls, the date of which is several years in the future.

=== Reception ===
Reception

Aggregate scores
Aggregator	Score
Metacritic	PC: 73/100; PS4: 76/100; XONE: 69/100
OpenCritic	67%

Review scores
Publication	Score
Destructoid	8.5/10
GameSpot	6/10
Push Square	7/10
Den of Geek	3.5/5

Critical reception to AWE was mixed to positive. Metacritic recorded scores of 73 out of 100 for Windows, 76 for PlayStation 4 and 69 for Xbox One. OpenCritic recorded an average score of 77 out of 100, with 67 percent of critics recommending the expansion.

Reviewers concentrated heavily on the integration of Alan Wake into Control. Makedonski described AWE as Remedy's first substantial attempt to connect its fictional settings and praised the decision to import the atmosphere and themes of Alan Wake, rather than treating the crossover as a collection of references. He felt that this altered the tone of Control sufficiently to make the combination of the two series stronger than either component of the expansion considered in isolation. Graham Banas of Push Square likewise praised the use of Alan Wake's light mechanics within Control, finding their incorporation unusually natural, but cautioned that many story details had little meaning for players unfamiliar with the earlier game.

Other reviewers were more critical of the amount of narrative payoff. Hornshaw considered the additional information about Bright Falls, Emil Hartman and Alan Wake enjoyable for followers of Remedy's fiction, but thought the expansion failed to satisfy the expectations generated by Wake's first substantial appearance in a decade. Carli Velocci of Windows Central similarly regarded it primarily as a teaser for a future Remedy project rather than a complete continuation of either Jesse or Alan's story. She praised the documents filling in portions of the intervening history of Alan Wake, but considered Alan's direct involvement limited and the central plot underdeveloped.

The expansion's horror elements were more positively received. Crouse considered AWE stronger than The Foundation in its horror and world-building and praised the combination of the Bureau's dry humor with the threat created by Hartman. Makedonski similarly thought the imported darkness changed the feel of the Oldest House and made AWE more recognizably influenced by Alan Wake than a conventional crossover based on character appearances alone. Banas praised the light-based encounters and boss arenas but felt the underlying Investigations Sector was visually less inventive than the Foundation.

Hartman's repeated encounters drew a more divided reaction. Crouse initially considered his obscured form effective horror imagery, but criticized the final battle for turning him into an attritional boss whose repeated restoration of health weakened the tension established by the preceding encounters. Velocci similarly found the darkness mechanic increasingly repetitive as the expansion continued. Banas, while praising its integration with Control's mechanics, also thought the same underlying encounter was repeated too frequently.

The new mechanical additions received comparatively less attention. Crouse found the Surge weapon useful primarily as a direct explosive attack, while Banas considered it somewhat redundant alongside an existing explosive Service Weapon form. The arcade machines were more positively received by Banas, who highlighted the ability to replay major encounters from the base game.

== Other downloadable content ==
=== Photo Mode ===
Remedy released Photo Mode as part of update 1.04 on October 16, 2019. It provides a freely movable camera with adjustable field of view, focus distance, aperture and camera roll. Players can hide Jesse or other characters and select from ten filters before capturing an image. Photo Mode was free to all owners of the game and formed the first part of Remedy's announced post-launch roadmap. Its release preceded Expeditions and the two narrative expansions.

=== Expeditions ===
The free Expeditions mode was released on December 12, 2019. It becomes available late in the main campaign after Jesse obtains the Levitate ability and completes "My Brother's Keeper". The mode uses the Jukebox, an Object of Power in Central Executive, to transport Jesse to a dimension known as the Formation.

Entering an Expedition requires a Jukebox Token, which can be obtained through activities in the main game. Each run gives the player 25 minutes to complete four objectives. Expeditions have three sequential difficulty tiers, apply randomized gameplay modifiers and reward players with crafting materials, modifications and an exclusive outfit.

=== Bonus and formerly exclusive content ===
The PlayStation 4 Digital Deluxe edition originally contained an exclusive side mission, "Dr. Yoshimi Tokui's Guided Imagery Experience", featuring Hideo Kojima as the voice of Dr. Tokui. Other promotional editions and pre-orders included exclusive outfits.

In March 2025, more than five years after the game's original release, Remedy released update 1.30 for the Windows version. It made the Kojima mission available to all players and unlocked the formerly exclusive Astral Dive Suit, Tactical Response Gear and Urban Response Gear outfits. The update also introduced technical features including HDR, expanded ultrawide support and additional ray-tracing options.

== Control Ultimate Edition ==
In August 2020, 505 Games announced Control Ultimate Edition, which bundled the base game with The Foundation, AWE and the previously released updates. Purchasers of the Ultimate Edition on PlayStation 4 or Xbox One would receive the corresponding PlayStation 5 or Xbox Series X/S version without an additional charge. The same upgrade was not offered to owners of the original release who had separately purchased the Expansion Pass, despite those players owning the base game and both story expansions. The reason given by 505 Games was said that because only Ultimate Edition was being developed specifically for the new consoles, upgrades could be provided only from the corresponding Ultimate Edition on the previous generation; owners of the original version and its expansions would instead retain access through backwards compatibility. 505 Games said that it had investigated several upgrade options but encountered technical or commercial "blockers" that prevented it from providing an upgrade path with parity across every group of owners.

The decision by 505 Games not to offer an upgrade to owners of the original release who had separately purchased the Expansion Pass prior to the release of Control Ultimate Edition prompted criticism. GameSpot characterized the explanation from 505 Games as unlikely to satisfy players who had already purchased the base game and Season Pass, noting that Ultimate Edition contained the same game and expansion content that they already owned. The controversy intensified the following month when some PlayStation owners of earlier deluxe editions were temporarily granted access to Ultimate Edition before the entitlement was withdrawn. The incident attracted criticism because it appeared to demonstrate that existing owners could technically be assigned the newer edition despite 505 Games' earlier explanation of the upgrade restrictions.

== Legacy ==
AWE became particularly significant to Remedy's later development of a shared fictional setting. When announcing the expansion, Lake said the studio had wanted for more than a decade to construct interconnected stories with shared characters and mythology and explicitly identified AWE as the first official crossover event in the Remedy Connected Universe. Makedonski likewise regarded the expansion at release as Remedy's first ambitious attempt to make the connections between its games a substantive part of their narratives rather than background Easter eggs.

Writing for GamesRadar+ after the expansion's release, Mark Delaney argued that AWE substantially changed the narrative relationship between Control and Alan Wake. He highlighted its explanation of the Bureau's investigation of Bright Falls, its continuation of the histories of Hartman and Alice Wake, and its final warning of a future Altered World Event at Bright Falls. Delaney interpreted the latter as an indication that Remedy was preparing to return to the Alan Wake storyline. GameSpot's Hornshaw similarly argued shortly after release that the expansion pointed toward a continuation of Alan's story.

Following the announcement of Alan Wake 2, later commentary treated AWE retrospectively as the primary narrative bridge between the games. In a 2023 retrospective, Delaney wrote for GameSpot that Control, and particularly AWE, constituted Remedy's first overt acknowledgement of the connected universe. He noted that the expansion established the FBC's knowledge of Bright Falls and that its future-dated Altered World Event warning ultimately functioned as an early tease for Alan Wake 2.

The crossover relationship was subsequently reversed in Alan Wake 2's 2024 expansion The Lake House, which concerns a Federal Bureau of Control facility at Cauldron Lake. GamesRadar+ described the Remedy Connected Universe as having been "cemented" by AWE. Alan Wake 2 game director Kyle Rowley said that the teams responsible for the two franchises had discussed how the central themes of each could be incorporated into the other's game, citing their collaboration on AWE while discussing the corresponding use of Control concepts in The Lake House.
