= Courtney Hope =

American actress (born 1989)

- Born: August 15, 1989 (age 37); Dallas, Texas, U.S.
- Occupation: Actor
- Years active: 2000–present
- Known for: The Bold and The Beautiful; The Young and the Restless; Control
- Awards: Daytime Emmy Award

Courtney Hope (born August 15, 1989) is an American actress. She is known for playing Sally Spectra on daytime soap operas The Bold and the Beautiful (2017–2020) and The Young and the Restless (2020–present). She is a Daytime Emmy winner. Hope has also been a nominee for BAFTA Award for Performer in a Leading Role, D.I.C.E. Award for Outstanding Achievement in Character, and Daytime Emmy Award for Outstanding Supporting Actress in a Drama Series.

She is also known for portraying Beth Wilder and Jesse Faden in video games Quantum Break, Control, and Control Resonant, respectively.

== Career ==
=== The Bold and the Beautiful (2017–2020) ===
In January 2017, Hope joined the CBS daytime drama The Bold and the Beautiful as Sally Spectra, the grandniece of the original character played by Darlene Conley. Her first episode debut was on January 31, 2017. Hope's character was used to recreate previous iconic storylines between the original Sally Spectra (Darlene Conley) and Stephanie Forrester (Susan Flannery). Storylines included a personal and business rivalry with Steffy Forrester (Jacqueline MacInnes Wood), temporary relationships with Liam Spencer (Scott Clifton), Thomas Forrester (Pierson Fodé) and reviving the Spectra Fashion business which led to the introduction of new characters such as Shirley Spectra (Patrika Darbo), Sally's grandmother and sister to the original Sally. Coco Spectra (Courtney Grosbeck) Sally's sister, Saul Feinburg (Alex Wyse) a tailor for Spectra Fashions and her assistant Darlita (Danube Hermosillo). The storylines would also reintroduce C.J. Garrison (Mick Cain). These characters including Hope's would eventually leave the show in 2018 due to no further storylines involving Spectra Fashions. Hope made her final appearance on April 5, 2018, but rejoined the cast a few months later with a new storyline involving Wyatt Spencer (Darin Brooks), a new career at Forrester Creations and a rivalry with Flo Fluton (Katrina Bowden). In August 2020, Hope announced that she had been let go from the series, making her last appearance on August 5, 2020.

In 2021, Hope was nominated for a 2021 Daytime Emmy Award for Outstanding Supporting Actress in a Drama Series for her work as Sally Spectra on The Bold and the Beautiful.

=== The Young and the Restless (2020–present) ===
In October 2020, it was announced that Hope had joined the main cast of The Young and the Restless, reprising her role as Sally Spectra. Hope made her first episode debut on November 3, 2020. Executive producer and head writer Josh Griffith reintroduced the character with new storylines including Sally getting a new job at Jabot, recurring feuds with Summer Newman (Hunter King) and Phyllis Summers (Michelle Stafford), conspiring with Tara Locke (Elizabeth Leiner) and romances with Jack Abbott (Peter Bergman) and Adam Newman (Mark Grossman). When asked how all this started, Hope said it was a "definite collaborative meeting" with Griffith and the writers, saying, "They want to make sure the history is accurate and to make sure what has already happened is brought into the script when it's necessary to make sure that there is consistency. I definitely want to honor where they take Sally."

In 2024, Hope won the Daytime Emmy Awards for Outstanding Supporting Actress in a Drama Series for her work as Sally Spectra on The Young and the Restless.

== Personal life ==
=== Relationships ===
In 2016, Hope began dating General Hospital actor Chad Duell. The duo got engaged in February 2021. They were married in October of that year. In December, 2021, it was announced they had split. In January 2022, Duell revealed neither he nor Hope had "signed anything" and stated they were not "married or anything."

=== Lifestyle ===
Apart from her acting career, Hope is also a fitness instructor.

== Filmography ==
=== Film ===
Year	Title	Role	Notes
2005	Dogg's Hamlet, Cahoot's Macbeth	Theater Patron	
2007	Mad Bad	Teen in Diner #2	Uncredited
2010	Mob Rules	Alex	
2010	Prowl	Amber	
2010	Tic	Alex	
2012	Revan	Genesis	
2013	Someone Picked the Wrong Girl	Glock Girl	
2014	Swelter	Halle	
2016	The Divergent Series: Allegiant	Trial Factionless Dissenter	
2016	Displacement	Cassie Sinclair	
2017	A Friend's Obsession	Brooke	
2018	Gimme Shelter	Jett	

=== Television ===
Year	Title	Role	Notes
2000	Walker, Texas Ranger	Patient Molly	Episode: "Solder of Hate"
2005	Joan of Arcadia	Chelsea	Episode: "Spring Cleaning"
2005	Related	Anne	Episode: "Francesca"
2005	Mrs. Harris	Maderia Student	TV movie (uncredited)
2007	Out of Jimmy's Head	Angry Teen Girl	Episode: "Sleepover"
2007	Grey's Anatomy	Ariana	Episode: "Forever Young"
2007	Born in the USA	Amy Brenson	TV movie
2008	CSI: Miami	Cathy Meyers	Episode: "Power Trip"
2011	Criminal Minds	Lacey Campbell	Episode: "Epilogue"
2012	NCIS: Los Angeles	Mary Clark	Episode: "Recruit"
2014	Motivate Me	Clara	Episodes: "Whole Lotta Love" and "Whole Lotta More Love"
2015	NCIS	Petty Officer Second Class Judy Sloan	Episode: "Cabin Fever"
2015	Bones	Elizabeth Collins	Episode: "The Life in the Light"
2016	Transparent	Una	Episodes: "When the Battle is Over" and "Just the Facts"
2017–2020	The Bold and the Beautiful	Sally Spectra	Main role
2019	A Merry Christmas Match	Victoria	TV movie
2020–present	The Young and the Restless	Sally Spectra	Main role

=== Video games ===
Year	Title	Role	Notes
2016	Quantum Break	Beth Wilder	Also likeness and motion capture
2016	Star Wars: The Old Republic	Sith Lord	Fourth expansion - Knights of the Eternal Throne
2019	Control	Jesse Faden	Also likeness and motion capture
2023	Alan Wake 2	Jesse Faden	Also likeness and motion capture
2026	Control Resonant	Jesse Faden	Also likeness and motion capture

== Awards and nominations ==
Year	Award	Category	Work	Result	Ref.
2019	The Game Awards	Best Performance	Control	Nominated	
2019	British Academy Games Awards	Performer in a Leading Role	Control	Nominated	
2019	D.I.C.E. Awards	Outstanding Achievement in Character	Control	Nominated	
2021	Daytime Emmy Awards	Outstanding Supporting Actress in a Drama Series	The Bold and the Beautiful	Nominated	
2024	Daytime Emmy Awards	Outstanding Supporting Actress in a Drama Series	The Young and the Restless	Won	
2025	Daytime Emmy Awards	Outstanding Supporting Actress in a Drama Series	The Young and the Restless	Nominated	
