= Sam Lake =

Finnish video game writer and director

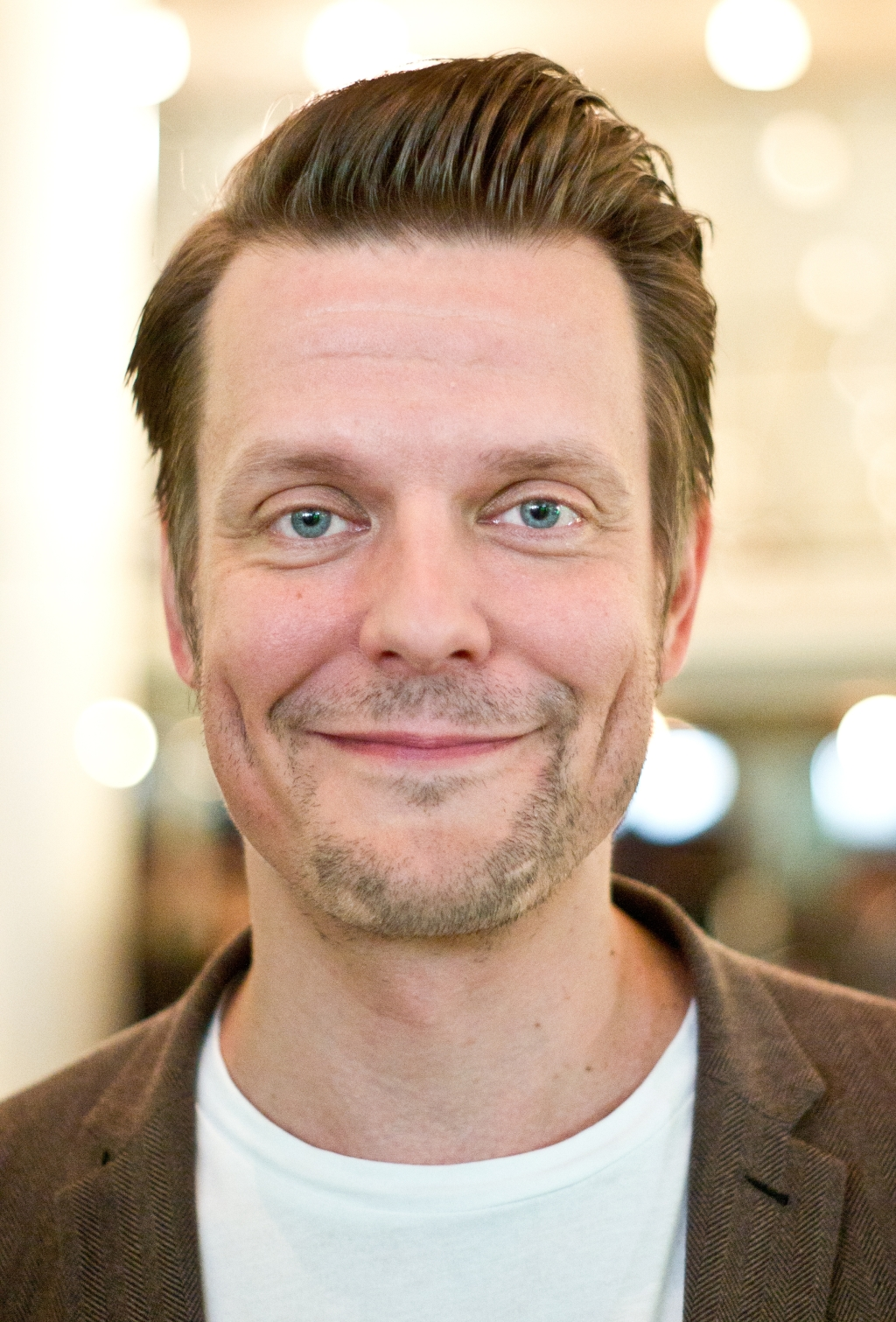
- Lake at Gamescom in Cologne, Germany, 2014
- Born: Sami Antero Järvi; 28 March 1970 (age 56); Helsinki, Finland
- Education: University of Helsinki
- Occupations: Writer; director; auteur
- Employer: Remedy Entertainment (Creative director)
- Known for: Max Payne; Max Payne 2; Alan Wake; Quantum Break; Control; Alan Wake 2

Sami Antero Järvi (Finnish: [ˈsɑmi ˈɑntero ˈjærʋi]; born 28 March 1970), better known by his pen name Sam Lake ('Järvi' is Finnish for lake), is a Finnish video game writer and director. He is the creative director at Remedy Entertainment, known for his writing (as well as his likeness) on the Max Payne video game series, as well as directing the two Alan Wake games (2010; 2023) and writing Control (2019).

== Career ==
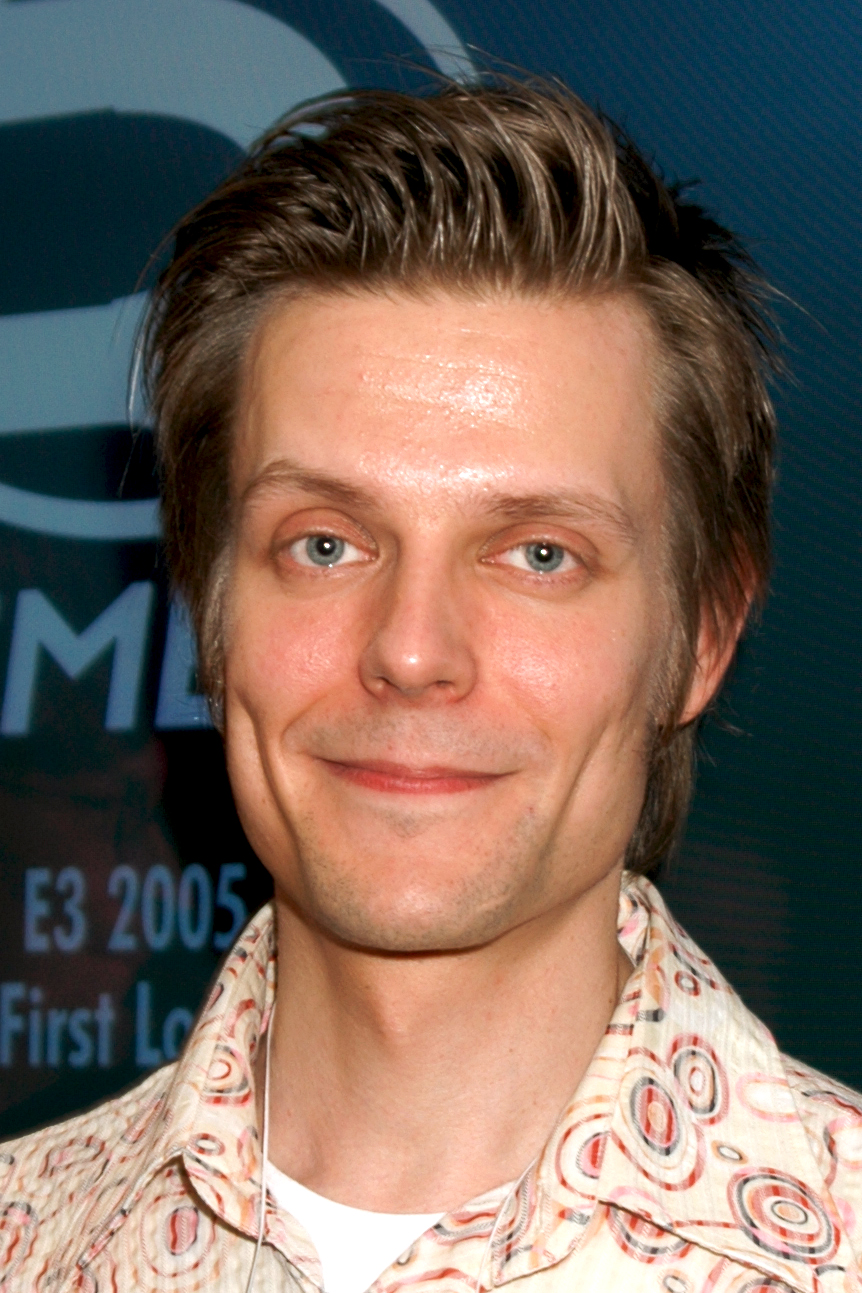
Lake at E3 at the Los Angeles Convention Center in 2005

Lake attended University of Helsinki studying English literature around 1995. He was introduced to video games through a long-time friend Petri Järvilehto, one of the early members of Remedy Entertainment. Remedy was developing their first game Death Rally and needed text for the game, and Järvilehto asked Lake, one of the few people Remedy knew in writing, to help. Lake accepted the offer, and has since remained with the company.

=== Max Payne ===
Lake played several roles in the development of Max Payne (2001). He wrote the game's story and script and helped design levels. Because of the game's budget, Remedy could not hire actors. As a result, Lake, along with other Remedy programmers, artists and staff played the roles. Lake became the face model for the title character and he even got his mother to portray Nicole Horne, the game's main antagonist, whereas his father played Alfred Woden.

In the sequel, Max Payne 2: The Fall of Max Payne (2003), the expanded budget meant Lake could stick to writing. The game's script ended up being about four times as long as some movie scripts. For the sequel, the budget increase allowed the team to hire professional actors to model for the graphic novel cutscenes and Lake was subsequently replaced by actor Timothy Gibbs. However, if the player should watch any of the TV set shows during the game, they will see that Lake models for various characters in Max Payne's meta, in TV shows and billboards, such as John Mirra in the television show Address Unknown as well as "Lord Valentine" and "Mama" in Lords and Ladies, and, finally, "Dick Justice" in Dick Justice.

The ending theme song, "Late Goodbye" which appears in various points of the game, often sung by in game characters, is based on a poem by Lake. The song was written by the Finnish rock band Poets of the Fall.

Mob boss Vinnie Gognitti remarks that the creator of Max Payne's in-game cartoon series, Captain Baseball Bat Boy, is a man named Sammy Waters, which is a play on the name Sam Lake.

In the Max Payne film which was released in 2008, Sam Lake also provided some writing help, though mostly for the character background.

=== Alan Wake ===
Lake was the lead writer and director for the 2010 "psychological action thriller" Alan Wake, which went on to receive numerous awards and a positive critical reception for its characters and story. He appears as fictional movie star Sam Lake in an in-universe TV show alongside Alan Wake. The first game also features references to Lake's earlier work with Max Payne when the player is allowed to read a few pages from the protagonist's novel The Sudden Stop. When opened, the pages are voiced by James McCaffrey, the voice of Max Payne, and makes clear references to the previous games, such as the troubled character's murdered wife and baby, and his abuse of painkillers.

Following Alan Wake, Lake went on to serve as creative director for Remedy's following project Quantum Break (2016) and was the lead writer of Control (2019); both games were well received by critics.

Lake would return to direct and write the sequel Alan Wake II (2023), in which he also makes an in-game appearance, cast in-universe as Alex Casey, the detective subject of Alan Wake's novels. Lake also appears as himself in the game's first downloadable content expansion, "Night Springs".

== Works ==
=== Games ===
Year	Title	Role(s)
1996	Death Rally	Writer
2001	Max Payne	Story, writer
2003	Max Payne 2: The Fall of Max Payne	Story, writer
2010	Alan Wake	Story, writer
2012	Alan Wake's American Nightmare	Creative director, story, writer
2016	Quantum Break	Creative director, story, executive producer
2019	Control	Creative director, story, writer
2023	Alan Wake 2	Director, creative director, story, writer

=== Likeness and acting roles ===
==== Video games ====
Year	Title	Role	Notes
2001	Max Payne	Max Payne	Likeness
2010	Alan Wake	Himself	Live action cameo
2016	Quantum Break	Alex Casey	Live action cameo
2019	Death Stranding	Veteran Porter	Likeness
2023	Alan Wake 2	Alex Casey, Himself	Likeness, motion capture, Live action & Voice (Himself)
2025	Dead Take	Frank Gardeu	
2026	Control Resonant	Nightswatchman's Partner	Live action cameo

== Awards and nominations ==
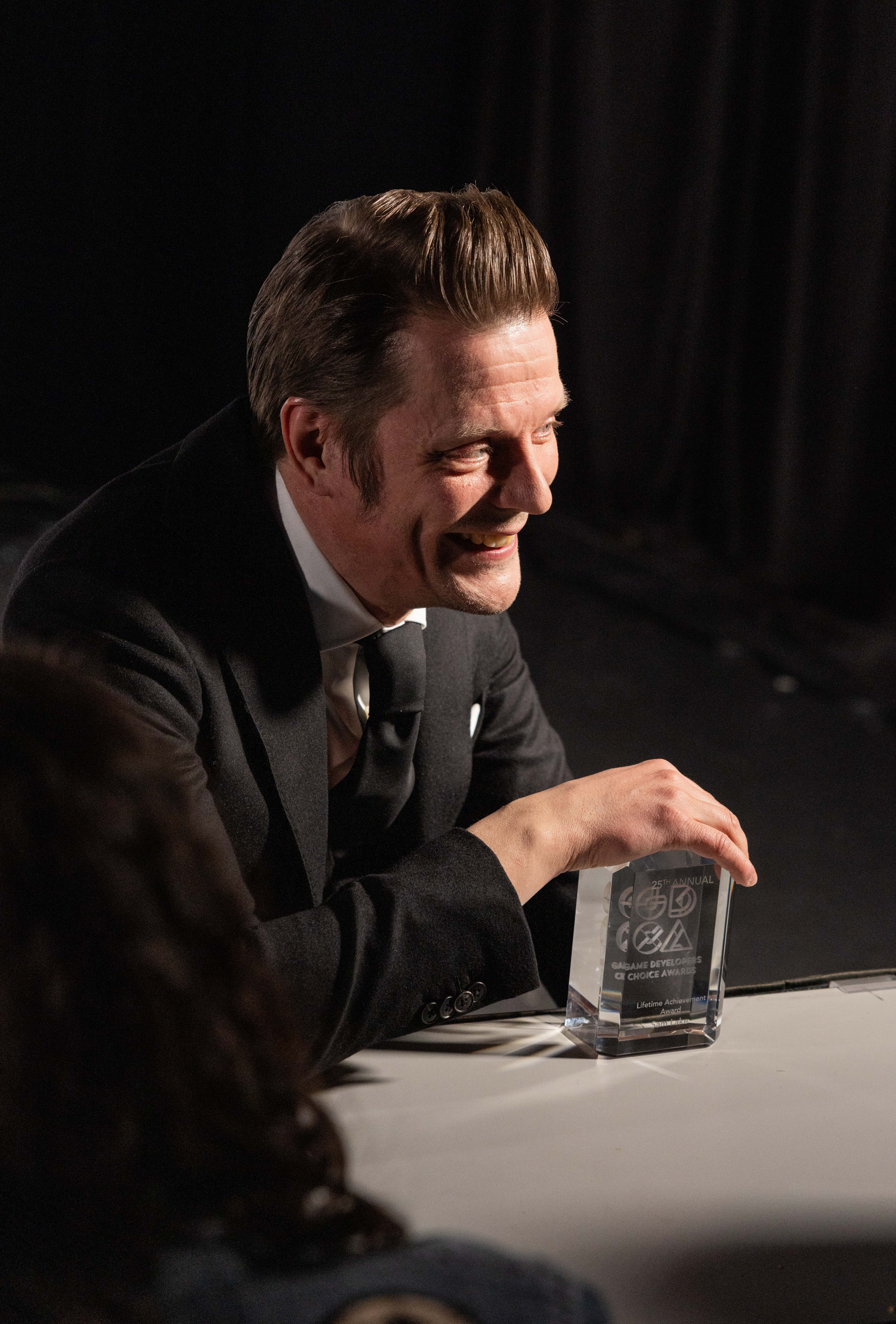
Lake won the Lifetime Achievement Award at the 25th Game Developers Choice Awards at the Moscone Center in San Francisco, California, 2025

Year	Award	Category	Nominated work	Result	Ref.
2020	23rd Annual D.I.C.E. Awards	Outstanding Achievement in Character (Jesse Faden)	Control	Nominated	
2020	23rd Annual D.I.C.E. Awards	Outstanding Achievement in Story	Control	Nominated	
2024	27th Annual D.I.C.E. Awards	Game of the Year	Alan Wake II	Nominated	
2024	27th Annual D.I.C.E. Awards	Adventure Game of the Year	Alan Wake II	Nominated	
2024	27th Annual D.I.C.E. Awards	Outstanding Achievement in Character (Saga Anderson)	Alan Wake II	Nominated	
2024	27th Annual D.I.C.E. Awards	Outstanding Achievement in Story	Alan Wake II	Nominated	
2024	20th British Academy Games Awards	Performer in a Supporting Role	Alan Wake II	Nominated	
2025	14th New York Game Awards	Andrew Yoon Legend Award	—N/a	Won	
2025	25th Game Developers Choice Awards	Lifetime Achievement Award	—N/a	Won	
