= Control (video game) =

2019 video game

- Developer: Remedy Entertainment
- Publishers: 505 Games (2019–2025); Remedy Entertainment (2025–)
- Director: Mikael Kasurinen
- Producer: Juha Vainio
- Designer: Paul Ehreth
- Programmer: Sean Donnelly
- Artist: Janne Pulkkinen
- Writer: Sam Lake
- Composers: Petri Alanko; Martin Stig Andersen
- Engine: Northlight Engine
- Platforms: PlayStation 4; Windows; Xbox One; Nintendo Switch; PlayStation 5; Xbox Series X/S; Stadia; macOS; iOS; iPadOS; visionOS
- Release: 27 August 2019: PS4, Windows, Xbox One 27 August 2019 Amazon Luna 20 October 2020 Nintendo Switch 30 October 2020 PS5, Xbox Series X/S 2 February 2021 Stadia 27 July 2021 macOS 26 March 2025 iOS, iPadOS 22 April 2026 visionOS 2026
- Genre: Action-adventure
- Mode: Single-player

Control is a 2019 action-adventure game developed by Remedy Entertainment. It follows Jesse Faden, the new Director of the Federal Bureau of Control (FBC), a secret U.S. government agency that investigates and contains phenomena that violate the normal laws of reality. As Jesse, the player explores the Oldest House–the FBC's headquarters–and uses paranormal abilities and a shapeshifting gun known as the "Service Weapon" to combat the Hiss, a hostile, otherworldly entity that has invaded and corrupted the FBC. Players unlock new powers by locating Objects of Power, mundane objects imbued with energies from another dimension. The Oldest House has four sectors that can be explored at a nonlinear pace, and players are free to complete side quests and explore hidden areas.

Control was completed within three years with a €30 million budget. Its gameplay is significantly more open than Remedy's past games; the developers drew inspiration from role-playing and Metroidvania games. The game was written by Sam Lake and was inspired by paranormal stories about the fictional SCP Foundation, based on the new weird genre. To demonstrate the game's destructible environmental systems, the Oldest House is designed in the brutalist style common in Cold-War-era government buildings. The game's voice cast includes Courtney Hope as Faden, and James McCaffrey, Matthew Porretta, and Martti Suosalo. The music was composed by Petri Alanko and Martin Stig Andersen. Control uses Remedy's in-house Northlight Engine and was among the first games to use real-time ray tracing built into the hardware of modern video cards.

505 Games published Control for PlayStation 4, Windows, and Xbox One in August 2019 and for the PlayStation 5 and Xbox Series X/S in February 2021. Remedy Entertainment began self-publishing the game in 2025. Control received generally positive reviews; critics praised its setting, art direction, gameplay, and characters, although its main story received mixed responses. The game sold over 6 million units by March 2026, and was nominated for several end-of-year accolades, including Game of the Year at The Game Awards 2019 and the 23rd Annual D.I.C.E. Awards. Two expansion packs were released, the second of which, AWE, being a crossover between Control and Alan Wake, forming part of a shared universe named the "Remedy Connected Universe". A sequel, Control Resonant, was released in 2026, and a multiplayer spin-off, FBC: Firebreak, was released in 2025.

== Gameplay ==
Jesse gains psychokinetic powers, such as levitation, over the course of the game. She is also armed with a "Service Weapon", a shapeshifting gun.

Control is an action-adventure video game that is played from a third-person perspective. The player assumes control of Jesse Faden, who is searching for her missing brother, as she arrives at the Oldest House, a featureless Brutalist skyscraper in New York City that houses the headquarters of the fictional Federal Bureau of Control (FBC). Most enemies in Control are human FBC agents who are possessed by the Hiss, an otherworldly force that is attempting to cross through a dimensional barrier into this reality. Enemies range from firearm-carrying humans to heavily mutated variants with superpowers.

To combat these threats, Jesse is equipped with the "Service Weapon", a modular firearm that can shapeshift into five forms: Grip, Spin, Shatter, Pierce, Charge, and Surge. Each form has unique gameplay properties, ranging from a close-range, shotgun-like blast to a long-range, sniper-like form. Players can equip and swap between two weapon forms at any given time. Jesse also interacts with Objects of Power to gain psychokinetic abilities. These abilities include "Launch", which allows her to telekinetically hurl objects from the environment as projectiles at enemies; "Evade", a quick dash to avoid attacks; "Shield", which pulls rubble from the ground to block incoming attacks; "Seize", used to briefly turn enemies into allies; and "Levitate", which enables Jesse to fly. Outside of combat and transportation, the powers are essential for solving environmental puzzles. Three of the five base powers are optional, and may only be obtained through exploration or completion of side quests. The use of the Service Weapon and Jesse's psychokinetic powers is governed by two cooldown systems, allowing players to alternate between these combat options. The game lacks a traditional cover system; players must remain mobile because defeated enemies drop health that is necessary for Jesse's survival.

The Oldest House has an interior far larger than its exterior; the building is an enormous, constantly shifting supernatural realm that defies the laws of physics. Control is built in the Metroidvania format; the Oldest House has four sectors that can be explored at a nonlinear pace. Throughout the building, players encounter Control Points, which are unlocked by clearing enemies and serve as hubs for fast travel, skill upgrades, weapon modifications, and outfit changes. Reaching a Control Point will heal Jesse without resetting the level. As players progress, Jesse's security-clearance level will increase and players will gain new skills, allowing them to access previously locked rooms or reach hidden areas. The game's campaign is divided into 10 acts that are supplemented with 18 side quests. There are also "Board Countermeasures" quests, which are challenge activities that task players with eliminating Hiss under certain conditions, and timed challenges named "Bureau Alerts". The Oldest House is filled with hidden documents, audio recordings, full-motion video (FMV) and television shows that provide context about the game's world and its backstory. An artificial intelligence (AI) system known as the Encounter Director controls interactions with enemies based on the player's level and their location in the Oldest House.

Players can further strengthen the Service Weapon and Jesse's attributes by equipping mods, with a maximum of three Weapon and three Personal mods allowed at once. Players can also craft their own mods through the Astral Construct system using materials and Source Energy, the latter of which is collected through killing the Hiss or decommissioning unwanted mods. Mods are divided into levels of rarity; more-rare mods offer greater power but require more resources to produce. Source Energy is essential for upgrading the forms of the Service Weapons. Completion of quests rewards players with Ability Points, which can be spent to upgrade Jesse's psychokinetic powers, increasing its damage, adjust its properties, and widen its use. They can also increase Jesse's maximum health, Energy, which dictates how frequently she can use her powers, and the strength of her melee attacks. Spending sufficient Ability Points grants players additional Milestone Rewards, which typically unlock additional mod slots for further customization.

== Synopsis ==
=== Setting ===
Control revolves around the Federal Bureau of Control (FBC), a clandestine U.S. government agency that investigates supernatural Altered World Events (AWEs). These AWEs affect the human collective unconscious and have "paranatural" effects, including manipulating reality through extradimensional spaces called Thresholds, and the creation of archetypal but powerful items called Objects of Power. Objects of Power are connected to the Board, a black, pyramid-shaped entity that exists within the Astral Plane, an alternate dimension. The individual chosen by the Board to wield the Service Weapon, an Object of Power, is considered by default to be the director of the FBC. Control takes place within the Oldest House, a Brutalist skyscraper in New York City that houses the headquarters of the FBC. The Oldest House is a Place of Power with several paranatural characteristics: it resists being noticed by anyone other than FBC members and individuals with an innate sensitivity to the paranatural, its interior is larger than its exterior, and its internal architecture is prone to shifting and rearranging in unpredictable ways. The FBC can stabilize portions of the Oldest House for its use by harnessing nexuses of resonance called Control Points.

The protagonist of Control is Jesse Faden (Courtney Hope), whom the Board has chosen as the director of the FBC to replace the recently deceased Zachariah Trench (James McCaffrey). Seventeen years prior, Jesse and her younger brother Dylan (Sean Durrie) were involved in an Altered World Event in their hometown of Ordinary, Maine. After discovering an Object of Power in the form of a slide projector, the two children accidentally unleashed paranatural forces that caused Ordinary's adult population to vanish. Jesse and Dylan were rescued by Polaris, a mysterious telepathic entity. Shortly thereafter, the FBC arrived in Ordinary, capturing Dylan and the slide projector, while Jesse fled with Polaris. In the present day, Jesse arrives at the Oldest House seeking her brother.

Other notable characters in Control include missing Head of Research Dr. Casper Darling (Matthew Porretta), research specialist Emily Pope (Antonia Bernath), security chief Simon Arish (Ronan Summers), Head of Operations Helen Marshall (Jade Anouka), Panopticon supervisor Frederick Langston (Derek Hagen), and a mysterious Finnish janitor named Ahti (Martti Suosalo).

=== Plot ===
In October 2019, after receiving a telepathic message from Polaris, Jesse Faden arrives at the Oldest House in search of her kidnapped brother Dylan. Inside the building, Jesse discovers Trench's deceased corpse and Polaris instructs her to pick up his fallen Service Weapon. The weapon translocates Jesse to the Astral Plane, where the Board appoints her the new director of the FBC as Trench's replacement. Exiting Trench's office, Jesse is attacked by FBC agents possessed by an entity she dubs "the Hiss". Jesse learns the Oldest House is under emergency lockdown following the Hiss's spread, and that the Hiss has possessed everyone in the building except those wearing Hedron Resonance Amplifiers (HRAs), devices built by missing Bureau scientist Dr. Casper Darling. Jesse agrees to help the surviving agents reclaim the building and contain the Hiss in exchange for information on Dylan's whereabouts.

Using an Object of Power known as the Hotline, Jesse communicates with the deceased Trench and learns his former management team knows the secrets of the Bureau. After lifting the building's lockdown in the Maintenance Sector, Jesse enters the Research Sector in search of Helen Marshall, one of Trench's management team, whom she helps secure the production of more HRAs by reactivating Dr. Darling's HRA machine and later retrieving Black Rock Prisms from the Quarry. Marshall reveals Dylan, known to the Bureau as Prime Candidate 6 (P6), was being groomed to succeed Trench as the Bureau's director due to his immense supernatural abilities. After killing several Bureau agents, however, Dylan was deemed too dangerous and locked in the Containment Sector. Jesse rushes to the sector to find Dylan, only to learn he has escaped and surrendered to the Bureau in the Executive Sector. Dylan reveals to Jesse he has embraced the Hiss, and that the Hiss infiltrated the Oldest House through the slide projector, an Object of Power the Bureau recovered from Ordinary.

Searching for the projector in the Containment Sector, Jesse discovers the Bureau had been conducting experiments to recreate the AWE in Ordinary, while tracking her whereabouts as a potential candidate for Director of the Bureau. After finding the projector had been moved by Dr. Darling to Dimensional Research, she seeks the aid of Ahti, a paranatural entity who manifests as the Oldest House's janitor, and he gifts Jesse a cassette player that enables her to navigate an elaborate and shape-shifting maze protecting the projector's location. At Dimensional Research, Jesse discovers the power source of the HRAs to be an enormous, hexagonal entity dubbed Hedron by Trench and Dr. Darling after they discovered it in an alternate dimension known as Slidescape-36 via the projector. Jesse recognizes it as Polaris but her attempts to free it inadvertently invites Hiss attacks that destroy Hedron. With Polaris defeated, Jesse's mind is invaded by the Hiss, where she learns Trench too had been possessed by the Hiss during expeditions to Slidescape-36 and manipulated into releasing it onto the Oldest House. Discovering parts of Polaris still remained in her being, Jesse successfully repels the Hiss and chases down Dylan, who attempts to enter the Astral Plane through the slide projector and overtake the Board. She deactivates the slide projector and seemingly cleanses the Hiss from Dylan, closing the portal but leaving Dylan in a coma. In the aftermath, the Oldest House remains infested by the Hiss and under lockdown to prevent its escape, but Jesse has come to terms with her new role as director and decides to find a solution with the FBC's surviving personnel.

== Development ==
Control was one of the first games to support graphics cards with real-time ray tracing. Here, the bottom image, with ray-tracing enabled, shows reflections of light and other surfaces in the marble floor, compared to the more traditionally rendered version shown on top.

Control was developed by Finnish studio Remedy Entertainment as its first major release since its 2017 initial public offering (IPO) and separation from Microsoft as a publishing partner. Control was developed using more efficient development strategies to reduce costs and development time. The game was completed within three years with a €30 million budget, a lower cost than that for a typical triple-A game. Control was directed by Mikael Kasurinen, who worked on Alan Wake as lead gameplay designer and Quantum Break as lead director; and Sam Lake was the writer and creative director. Lake created the game's story and characters during the pre-production stage, and narrative lead Anna Megill developed its content.

Control was developed using Remedy's proprietary Northlight Engine, which was first used on its previous game, Quantum Break. Control was one of the first major games to be released after the introduction of graphics cards that support real-time ray-tracing through DirectX Raytracing, and was the first major game with a nearly full implementation of all available Nvidia RTX features and support for Nvidia's DLSS for resolution upscaling on supported graphics cards.

=== Gameplay ===
Gameplay was one of Remedy's development priorities for Control. Whereas earlier Remedy games explore supernatural themes, Control is the first game in which the protagonist wields supernatural powers. The powers were designed to be easily recognizable and grounded in reality; the developers avoided adding magical abilities that would feel outlandish in the game's setting. The telekinetic powers were designed to feel intuitive: players do not need to manually target the environment to pick up objects, and grabbed objects can be hurled to deliver devastating damage. To achieve this, Remedy replaced the Havok physics in Northlight with PhysX.

The abilities and the Service Weapon are designed to complement each other in combat. One resource slowly recharges while the other is in use, encouraging players to strategically switch between them. The Service Weapon was designed as a highly capable tool for dispatching enemies. The artificial intelligence (AI) of the enemies in the game was designed to be aggressive, forcing players to use all of the skills in their toolset. Internally, the Service Weapon was compared to Excalibur; whoever wields the gun became the director of the FBC. Remedy considered Control to be a challenging experience; Thomas Puha, Remedy's head of communications, compared the game to Dark Souls. The developers wanted to give players more options in combat and introduced enemy variants that force players to instantly change strategy because different enemies have different vulnerabilities. Mods expand gameplay variety by allowing diverse builds. Players often need to adapt their approach to combat encounters based on their available equipment mods and weapon forms.

To give players more agency, Kasurinen wanted the game to be non-linear, and adopted elements from sandbox games, role-playing games and Metroidvania games. It was a response to Quantum Break, a linear action game that took five years to develop but only took players about eight hours to complete. This design meant Control became less curated; as a result, the developers adopted a minimalist head-up display and removed waypoints. The mission logs only inform players about locations of interest, and players must find their way there. This approach avoided funneling players toward a particular direction and lets players immerse themselves in the game's world, encouraging exploration. Areas in the game are interconnected, and each FBC sector has a large, central area with multiple exits that lead players in different directions. In-game signage was created to guide players to different rooms in a sector. Making some of the in-game powers optional created a unique challenge for the developers designing combat encounters and level layouts because they did not know what powers the player character would have during a combat encounter. As a result, the team spent a lot of time in the quality assurance (QA) process to ensure players would not accidentally exploit the game and venture to unintended areas using Jesse's powers. Early versions of the game included cooperative multiplayer, which was eventually cut from the game.

=== Setting ===
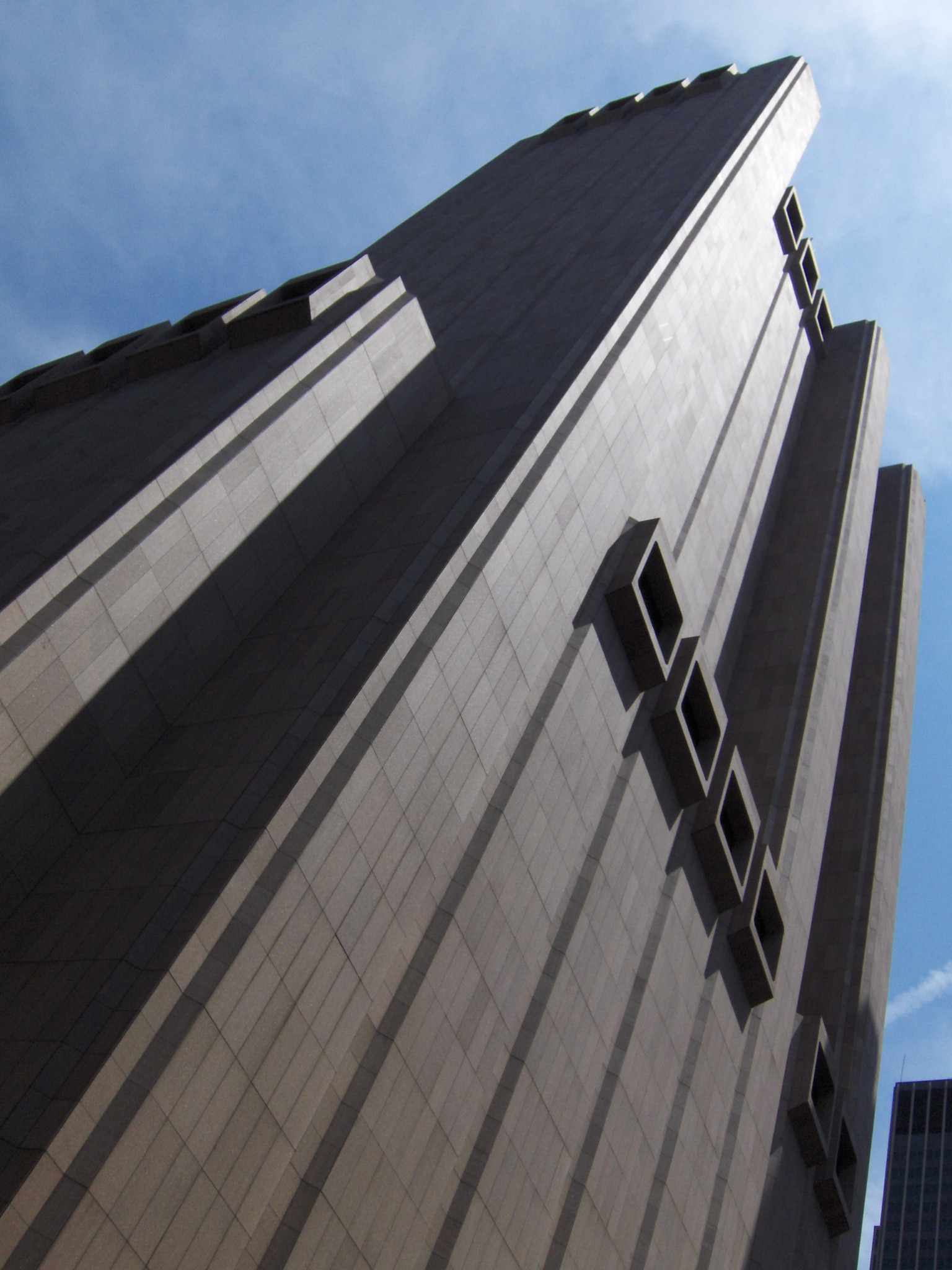
33 Thomas Street served as inspiration for the Oldest House.

The Oldest House setting is based on brutalist architecture, a style using large concrete blocks popularized in the 1950s and used in many contemporaneous government buildings. The game's world-design director Stuart Macdonald described brutalism as a good science-fiction setting because it has "this sense of power, weight, strength and stability to it". The clean, utilitarian design of the Oldest House provides juxtaposition against the Hiss, a supernatural, otherworldly being that reconfigures the building's architecture to suit its needs. Among the Oldest House's real-world influences is 33 Thomas Street, formerly known as the AT&T Long Lines Building, a windowless building in the center of New York City. Macdonald used this building as a modern example of brutalism and created the Oldest House as a "bizarre, brutalist monolith" to house the FBC. Boston City Hall, the Andrews Building at the University of Toronto Scarborough, and the Met Breuer, among others, also served as inspiration for the Oldest House. The relatively flat colors of the background walls make the Oldest House an ideal canvas for showcasing design and lighting effects; it works well with the telekinesis powers because the concrete walls are used in lieu of a target object when the player uses telekinesis to throw debris at foes. The initially pristine spaces eventually show the results of a large, destructive battle. Ultimately, it made environmental destruction visually easy to communicate to readers.

The work of other real-world architects inspired the game's structures. Carlo Scarpa's work was heavily used in designing stairways that ascend with other parts of the structure, while Tadao Ando's focus on lighting and spiritual spaces is reflected in other parts. The Oldest House's interior design drew inspiration from the Yale Center for British Art, particularly Louis Kahn's blend of concrete and wood, as well as the office designs of Kevin Roche and efficiency pioneer Frederick Winslow Taylor. Both Roche and Taylor emphasize compartmentalized layouts that prioritize productivity and operational efficiency. The design team also took inspiration from films, such as those of Stanley Kubrick, particularly A Clockwork Orange, as well as films featuring oppressive government agencies such as The Shape of Water. Other films, like Tinker Tailor Soldier Spy, evoke the concept of repetition, process, and ritualism in these agencies, and that was used to define some of the internal artwork and architecture. Art director Janne Pulkkinen stated they looked at churches and other places where ritual is common because lighting and design of those spaces are often used to draw attention to points of interest.

Unlike previous Remedy games, Control departs from common tropes of genre fiction. Kasurinen said it allowed the developers to retain "Remedy quirkiness without the setting limiting it", and to incorporate elements that are "a lot stranger". Because Control was Remedy's intellectual property (IP), the studio was willing to be controversial with it. The gathered writings of the fictional SCP Foundation website were a major influence on Control. Stories on the SCP Foundation's site are based on singular objects with strange, paranormal impacts, and are narratively linked by the common format of reports written by the fictional SCP Foundation, which catalogs and studies the objects. Control was built atop this mythos, having the Objects of Power and Altered Items, along with collectible writings about these objects. The developers fixed the story in the genre of the new weird, a modern variant of weird fiction, with stories that combine science fiction and fantasy, often involving a bureaucratic government agency. In Control, the developers reversed the role to place the bureaucracy at the center of the story; the game's narrative designer Brooke Maggs said an oppressive bureaucracy in a corporate office environment contributes to an unnerving experience. Kasurinen said the Hiss was also inspired by the genre; he described it as a disease trying to invade a human body, and that it will slowly try to corrupt and take over its host.

According to Kasurinen, one of the game's core themes is the "conflict of collision of strange and mundane". Control is filled with familiar, commonplace objects that seem innocuous until players discover their altered, often horrifying or incomprehensible, nature through paranatural phenomena. According to the developers, unease and tension emanate from knowing even the most-ordinary items, such as a fridge, a floppy disc or a Merry-Go-Round horse, could be immensely powerful and dangerous. Typical of new weird stories, the FBC will never know the true purposes or the extent of power of these commonplace items, and the FBC's approach of applying scientific theories to them would not have worked. Maggs said Control is not a terrifying experience; instead, the game builds tension, and creates a sense of dread and a sense of awe due to the unknowable and elusive nature of the threat. Works of David Lynch, the Southern Reach Series (including Annihilation), 2001: A Space Odyssey, Mr. Robot, Inception, Stalker, and Legion, were cited as sources of inspiration for the game.

=== Narrative design ===
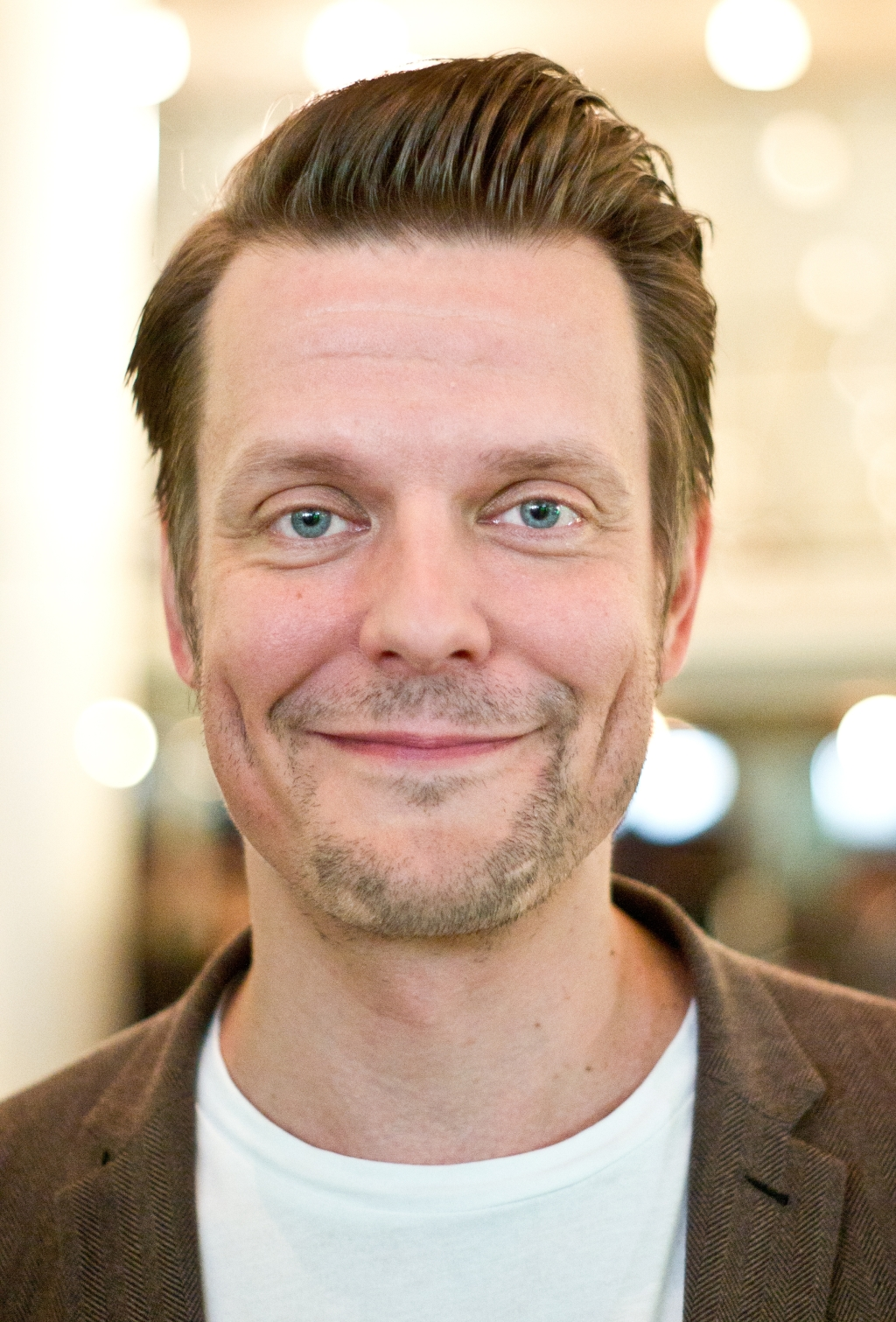
Sam Lake served as Control's creative director who developed its original story.

Mikael Kasurinen envisioned a Remedy game that broke from tradition, one that emphasizes world-building rather than being character-driven. The developers first created a vision for the game's world, rather than building its world around a screenplay. The first concept was creating the FBC, a realistic setting that would serve as a basis for paranormal events and a catalyst for the story. This enabled Remedy to consider stories they could tell about the player-character and other individuals in the FBC, but this created the challenge of presenting the stories of the other characters in the open-world format. As a result, the developers relied less on cutscenes and focused more on creating in-game conversations with non-playable characters (NPCs). Kasurinen wanted to give players the autonomy to figure out its mystery to create a more gripping and haunting experience. He again cited Dark Souls as an inspiration for Control's approach to storytelling, and said some story threads are intentionally left open for players to interpret. Whereas the main story focuses on Jesse's personal arc, the side stories focus on the game's world and its inhabitants. The development team used environmental storytelling to spark players' interest in optional content, rewarding curiosity and exploration with additional narrative and new playable powers. These areas are not necessarily tied to the main narrative.

Many of Control's voice cast also appear in Remedy's previous games. Courtney Hope stars as Jesse Faden, James McCaffrey plays Zachariah Trench, and Matthew Porretta, who plays Casper Darling. is featured in voice roles and live-action videos. Jeremiah Trench was the first character created for Control; according to Lake, Trench represented the FBC and its questionable morals, and he was "a man of action" and "a cynic" who had "suffered a great tragedy". The development team designed Jesse as an FBC outsider with insider connections. This concept forms the basis of a key plot point concerning the FBC's involvement in a tragedy during Jesse's childhood. Jesse faced the crisis with a sense of relief; the unfolding events confirm her childhood memories of the incident are not a delusion but reality. Hope was inspired by Vera Farmiga's performance in The Conjuring and the way her character remains calm in extraordinary situations. As with Max Payne, self-narration forms a part of the Control's narrative, allowing players to know more about Jesse's true feelings about the world and characters around her. There was a desire to make the game feel less "American"; Lake said he had been yearning to add his native Finland to one of their games. Finnish actor Martti Suosalo voices the janitor Ahti, one of the game's supporting characters. The game's music score includes a Finnish tango Lake wrote, Petri Alanko composed, and Suosalo sang. The game also includes a voice cameo by Hideo Kojima and his English translator Aki Saito in a side mission.

Remedy used fewer live-action elements in Control than in Quantum Break; most of the live-action footage in Control is of Casper Darling explaining parts of the Oldest House and Objects of Power within it. According to Lake, these videos were designed to be "slightly crude, clumsy, amateurish by design", and "slightly awkward and clumsy" because they were intended for internal training of FBC agents. Control also includes short episodes of a fictional show called "The Threshold Kids", a puppet-based show seemingly aimed at children who may reside in the Oldest House. Extra story elements are delivered through environmental objects, such as audio recordings and documents, or via live-action video footage played on in-game televisions. Given the game's heavy emphasis on environmental destruction, these methods allowed the developers to organically convey backstory without interruption, avoiding disruptive cinematics that could pull players out of the experience.

The core game includes Easter eggs referring to Alan Wake, which shares paranormal themes with Control; one such Easter egg discusses the aftermath of Alan Wake as part of the FBC's case files, which reveals events that occurred in Bright Falls, the primary location of Alan Wake, to have been an AWE. A secret area includes a vision of Alan Wake. A backmasked track in the credits sequence of Alan Wake: American Nightmare alludes to a past event in the town of Ordinary. Kasurinen said the inclusion of such references helps establish a continuity between its games, elements to be found and shared by its player community, but these are not necessarily meant to establish a shared universe. Sam Lake later confirmed the existence of a shared universe between Alan Wake and Control that is known as the Remedy Connected Universe. This was cemented with the release of the AWE expansion, directly bringing characters and events of Alan Wake into Control.

=== Music ===
The game's soundtracks were composed by Petri Alanko and Martin Stig Andersen. Alanko worked on the main themes and cutscenes in Control, while Andersen worked on the themes of exploration and combat. Alanko regularly joined Remedy's meetings to stay informed about the game's story to better understand the emotional materials he had to work with. To create the haunting sound of the Hiss, Alanko used a microphone that can record electromagnetic radiation to record sounds of heavy wood being dragged across a floor. He also burnt a piano and destroyed electronic equipment to record its sound. These sounds were then processed to hearing range, generating cacophonous droning sounds. The Hiss's main, six-note leitmotif was created very early in the game's development; Alanko used old choral recordings and processed the voices to strip away their normal pitch, creating a discordant sound to connote the otherworldly nature of the Hiss.

Poets of the Fall, an alternative rock group that are close friends of Remedy, provided songs, including "Take Control"; these songs are stated in-game to be by the fictional band "Old Gods of Asgard", an allusion to Alan Wake. Remedy used "Take Control" as part of the "Ashtray Maze", a section in which Jesse fights her way through an ever-changing set of rooms. Remedy worked with Poets of the Fall so they could dynamically incorporate the song as the player progresses through sections of the maze. Music from Poets of the Fall's album, including the track "My Dark Disquiet", is also featured in the game.

== Release ==
In May 2017, Remedy announced it had partnered with 505 Games to publish Control, then codenamed "P7". 505 provided marketing and publishing support, and €7.75 million to assist the development, while Remedy retained the intellectual property rights to Control. In a press release, Remedy said Control would have complex gameplay mechanics and that it would be a "longer term experience" than its previous games. P7 was being worked on by Remedy alongside two other projects. Control was officially revealed at Sony Interactive Entertainment's E3 2018 press conference.

Control was released for PlayStation 4, Microsoft Windows, and Xbox One on 27 August 2019. For the PC version of Control, Epic Games had secured a year-long exclusivity deal on the Epic Games Store with Digital Bros, the parent of 505 Games, for €9.49 million (US$10.5 million). The releases of the PlayStation 5 and Xbox Series X/S versions and updates were delayed from their original release date of late 2020 to improve the product's quality. The game was bundled for free for purchasers of Nvidia's GeForce RTX 20 series graphics processing units (GPUs) from July to August 2019. In January 2021, The Art and Making of Control, a companion book about the development of Control, was published by Future Press.

Cloud gaming-based versions were released for Amazon Luna and Nintendo Switch on 20 October and 28 October 2020, respectively. It was the first cloud-based game released on the Switch outside of Japan. Control was released on Google Stadia in July 2021. A version for macOS was released on 26 March 2025. It was released for iOS and iPadOS on 22 April 2026. A version for visionOS is still expected.

=== Downloadable content ===
Remedy supported Control with post-launch content, including two expansions that were set after the main game; in these, Jesse takes on her role as the FBC Director. The first expansion, "The Foundation", was released on 26 March 2020 for PS4 and Windows, and for Xbox One on 25 June 2020. It takes place in the Foundation of the Oldest House, a cave system in which the Astral Plane is set to collide with reality. "The Foundation" introduced new enemy types and side quests, a new character ability named "Shape" that allows Jesse to create platforms using crystals, and a weapon skill named "Fracture" that allows them to destroy said crystals. The second expansion, "AWE", was released on 27 August 2020. This expansion is a crossover between Control and Remedy Entertainment's previous game Alan Wake, which takes place in Bright Falls, Washington, United States. It explores the events of Alan Wake, establishing a shared universe. It also introduces a new Service Weapon form known as "Surge" that functions similarly to a grenade launcher, allowing Jesse to launch explosives at enemies and manually detonate them.

Smaller, non-narrative content has also been released. Photo Mode for the game was released in October 2019. "Expeditions", which presents standalone missions of various difficulty with power-up items for their character, was released as a free update on 12 December 2019. There are three difficulty tiers, the most-difficult tiers provide better rewards, and each run lasts for up to 25 minutes. A free update that was released alongside "AWE" increased the number of control points or hard checkpoints where saving is possible, adding control points before boss fights, as well as several "soft" checkpoints where players can restart without having to return to a control point should Jesse die. A new "assist mode" was added to allow the player to have more control over customizing the difficulty; Remedy intended this update to make game completion possible for novice players.

On 27 August 2020, the first anniversary of its release, Control: Ultimate Edition was released via Steam, including the base game, the "Foundation" and "AWE" expansions, and additional free updates. Players who owned the Ultimate Edition on PlayStation 4 or Xbox One were able to update their version on the newer consoles for no cost. 505 Games stated while they searched for a free upgrade path that would work for all users, there was "some form of blocker and those blockers meant that at least one group of players ended up being left out of the upgrade for various reasons". Digital versions were released on 2 February 2021, and retail copies on 2 March 2021.

== Reception ==
=== Critical reception ===
Reception

Aggregate score
Aggregator	Score
Metacritic	PC: 85/100; PS4: 82/100; XONE: 84/100; PC (Ultimate Edition): 84/100; NS: 72/100; PS5: 85/100; XSXS: 87/100

Review scores
Publication	Score
Game Informer	8.75/10
GameSpot	8/10
GamesRadar+	4.5/5
IGN	8.8/10
PC Gamer (US)	88/100
The Guardian	4/5

According to review aggregator website Metacritic, Control received "generally favorable" reviews from critics for most platforms, except for the Nintendo Switch version, which received "mixed or average" reviews.

Ben Reeves from Game Informer described Control's setting as "bizarrely fascinating" and an "eerie, dreamlike experience" players will remember even after finishing the game. Andrew Webster from The Verge similarly lauded the game's unsettling atmosphere, writing the Oldest House feels both surreal and authentic, and commended Remedy's world-building. Peter Brown from GameSpot praised the game's art direction, writing it instills a sense of dread and awe. Sam Loveridge from GamesRadar called the Oldest House a "captivating" and innovative setting that serves as a "character of its own". In The Guardian, Steve Boxer described Control as an "immaculately conceived paranormal fantasy" that "manages to feel simultaneously believable and beyond bizarre". Several critics considered Control on PC to potentially be a "killer app" for Nvidia's RTX graphics cards, citing the hardware's capacity to enhance the game's visual style.

The gameplay received generally positive reviews. Reeves said Jesse's psychic power, in particular her Launch ability, is central to the game's combat, adding their controls are intuitive but that other psychic powers are underwhelming in comparison. James Davenport from PC Gamer noted Control has the strongest gunplay in a Remedy game to date, and liked the gameplay cycle of switching between the Service Power and Jesse's powers. Davenport compared Control to Doom (2016), especially the way they reward players for playing aggressively. Dave Tach from Polygon wrote the combat is "bombastic and satisfying", and said the game's world interactivity is its "most impressive technical achievements". Several critics felt the progression system to be lacking because they failed to evolve the experience in the latter part of the game, because the upgrades did not significantly change the experience, and the game does not have enough enemy types, forcing players to change strategy. Andrew Webster from The Verge found the gunplay to be generic, and said the gameplay is not varied enough because it almost entirely relies on combat. He, however, found the telekinetic powers to be exhilarating. Critics generally liked the game's Metroidvania elements; some said this gameplay structure makes narrative sense in the context of the game's story. Boxer compared the game to Prey (2017), noting the addition of superpowers make exploration even more rewarding and fun. The in-game signage was also praised for being surprisingly helpful for navigation. The in-game map, however, was criticized for being confusing to read.

The story received mixed reviews. Matthew Gault from Time said Faden's story kept him engaged from start to finish. Reeves liked the way the story slowly reveals Jesse's backstory, but he found the motives of some characters to be unclear and excessively vague, resulting in plot points that can be confusing. Brown liked Remedy's restrained storytelling and its handling of strange themes, writing: "obfuscation is part of what makes Control so spellbinding". According to Davenport, the narrative is inaccessible at first but the game excels at making mundane objectives "fascinating and sinister". Loveridge liked the story's strangeness and praised Remedy for telling a "surreal narrative that's capable of making even the ordinary feel extraordinary". The game's characters and their voice performances were praised. Jonathon Dornbush from IGN described the cast as "eclectic" and liked the way each character has an "engrossing" personality. While he praised the quality of Remedy's writing, he said Jesse's main story is an "afterthought". Davenport found Jesse's personality to be "vapid" and disliked the way her story seemed quite disconnected from the rest of the cast. Several critics noted the game ends abruptly, though they recognized its side quests help extend the game's length even after the campaign has ended.

=== Sales ===
During its debut week, Control was the fourth-best-selling game in the United Kingdom, behind Astral Chain, Wreckfest, and Man of Medan. In the United States, Control failed to debut in the top 20 best-selling games in August 2019. In Japan, the PlayStation 4 version sold 10,336 physical units, making it the 13th best-selling retail game during its first week of release.

By December 2020, Control had sold over 2 million copies, and Remedy said it was their fastest-growing intellectual property since Max Payne. While Remedy was happy with the game's performance, CEO Tero Virtala said Control had not been "a major hit in our industry" in terms of sales. By August 2021, Remedy announced that over 10 million people had played Control, accounting for those who played it through Xbox Game Pass and other non-sales routes. By February 2024, Control had sold over 4 million units and had earned over €100 million in revenue. By November, the game had sold over 4.5 million units and reached over 19 million lifetime players. By June 2025, it had sold over 5 million units. By March 2026, it had sold over 6 million units.

=== Awards ===
Ars Technica, IGN, Game Informer, Electronic Gaming Monthly, and GamesRadar+ awarded Control as their "Game of the Year", while Polygon, Easy Allies, USGamer Giant Bomb, GameRevolution, Eurogamer, GameSpot, and The Verge listed Control among their top games of 2019.

Year	Award	Category	Result	Ref.
2018	Golden Joystick Awards	Most Wanted Game	Nominated	
2019	Game Critics Awards	Best Original Game	Nominated	
2019	Game Critics Awards	Best PC Game	Nominated	
2019	Game Critics Awards	Best Action/Adventure Game	Nominated	
2019	Golden Joystick Awards	Best Storytelling	Nominated	
2019	Golden Joystick Awards	Best Visual Design	Nominated	
2019	Golden Joystick Awards	Best Audio	Nominated	
2019	Golden Joystick Awards	Critics' Choice Award	Won	
2019	Golden Joystick Awards	Ultimate Game of the Year	Nominated	
2019	Titanium Awards	Game of the Year	Nominated	
2019	Titanium Awards	Best Art	Nominated	
2019	Titanium Awards	Best Game Design	Nominated	
2019	Titanium Awards	Best Narrative Design	Nominated	
2019	Titanium Awards	Best Adventure Game	Nominated	
2019	Titanium Awards	Best Soundtrack (Petri Alanko)	Nominated	
2019	The Game Awards 2019	Game of the Year	Nominated	
2019	The Game Awards 2019	Best Game Direction	Nominated	
2019	The Game Awards 2019	Best Narrative	Nominated	
2019	The Game Awards 2019	Best Art Direction	Won	
2019	The Game Awards 2019	Best Audio Design	Nominated	
2019	The Game Awards 2019	Best Performance (Courtney Hope)	Nominated	
2019	The Game Awards 2019	Best Performance (Matthew Porretta)	Nominated	
2019	The Game Awards 2019	Best Action/Adventure Game	Nominated	
2020	9th New York Game Awards	Great White Way Award for Best Acting in a Game (Courtney Hope)	Won	
2020	18th Visual Effects Society Awards	Outstanding Visual Effects in a Real-Time Project	Won	
2020	23rd Annual D.I.C.E. Awards	Game of the Year	Nominated	
2020	23rd Annual D.I.C.E. Awards	Action Game of the Year	Won	
2020	23rd Annual D.I.C.E. Awards	Outstanding Achievement in Game Direction	Won	
2020	23rd Annual D.I.C.E. Awards	Outstanding Achievement in Art Direction	Won	
2020	23rd Annual D.I.C.E. Awards	Outstanding Achievement in Character (Jesse Faden)	Nominated	
2020	23rd Annual D.I.C.E. Awards	Outstanding Achievement in Original Music Composition	Won	
2020	23rd Annual D.I.C.E. Awards	Outstanding Achievement in Story	Nominated	
2020	23rd Annual D.I.C.E. Awards	Outstanding Technical Achievement	Nominated	
2020	20th Game Developers Choice Awards	Game of the Year	Nominated	
2020	20th Game Developers Choice Awards	Best Audio	Won	
2020	20th Game Developers Choice Awards	Best Narrative	Nominated	
2020	20th Game Developers Choice Awards	Best Technology	Won	
2020	20th Game Developers Choice Awards	Best Visual Art	Won	
2020	SXSW Gaming Awards 2020	Video Game of the Year	Nominated	
2020	SXSW Gaming Awards 2020	Most Promising New Intellectual Property	Nominated	
2020	SXSW Gaming Awards 2020	Excellence in Art	Nominated	
2020	SXSW Gaming Awards 2020	Excellence in Design	Won	
2020	SXSW Gaming Awards 2020	Excellence in Narrative	Nominated	
2020	SXSW Gaming Awards 2020	Excellence in Technical Achievement	Nominated	
2020	SXSW Gaming Awards 2020	Excellence in Visual Achievement	Nominated	
2020	16th British Academy Games Awards	Best Game	Nominated	
2020	16th British Academy Games Awards	Game Design	Nominated	
2020	16th British Academy Games Awards	Animation	Nominated	
2020	16th British Academy Games Awards	Artistic Achievement	Nominated	
2020	16th British Academy Games Awards	Audio Achievement	Nominated	
2020	16th British Academy Games Awards	Music	Nominated	
2020	16th British Academy Games Awards	Narrative	Nominated	
2020	16th British Academy Games Awards	Original Property	Nominated	
2020	16th British Academy Games Awards	Performer in a Leading Role (Courtney Hope)	Nominated	
2020	16th British Academy Games Awards	Performer in a Supporting Role (Martti Suosalo)	Won	
2020	16th British Academy Games Awards	Technical Achievement	Nominated	
2020	18th Game Audio Network Guild Awards	Best Dialogue	Nominated	
2020	18th Game Audio Network Guild Awards	Best Original Instrumental	Nominated	
2020	18th Game Audio Network Guild Awards	Best Original Soundtrack Album	Nominated	
2020	18th Game Audio Network Guild Awards	Best Audio Mix	Nominated	

== Legacy ==
In June 2021, Remedy announced an agreement with 505 Games for a multiplayer spin-off and a "bigger-budget" project to further expand the Control series. In February 2024, Remedy acquired full ownership of the Control series from 505 Games. In August, Remedy partnered with Annapurna Pictures to adapt existing Remedy games, including the Control series, for film and television.

The "AWE" expansion of Control established the "Remedy Connected Universe". Lake said each game in the shared universe will be a standalone experience, but they will also serve as "a doorway into a larger universe with exciting opportunities for crossover events". Ahti and FBC agents appear in Alan Wake 2, while Dylan Faden and the Oldest House briefly appear in its downloadable content (DLC) pack "The Lake House", which sets up a sequel to Control. Control Resonant, an action role-playing video game whose protagonist is Dylan Faden, entered full production in February 2025 and released in September 2026. In Resonant, Dylan must find his missing sister and prevent the Hiss from consuming the whole world after they escape containment from the FBC into downtown Manhattan. A spin-off game, FBC: Firebreak, was released in June 2025. As a three-player cooperative multiplayer game, it sees players assume control as agents of FBC's containment unit who must enter the Oldest House to eliminate human enemies controlled by the Hiss. FBC: Firebreak was released to a mixed reception.
