= Jesse Faden =

Protagonist of the video game Control

- Control character
- Portrait of Jesse Faden for the Control Ultimate Edition cover art
- First appearance: Control (2019)
- Voiced by: Courtney Hope
- Portrayed by: Courtney Hope

Jesse Faden is a fictional character created by Remedy Entertainment and the protagonist of the 2019 video game Control and downloadable content expansions. Portrayed and voiced by Courtney Hope, Jesse enters the headquarters of the fictional "Federal Bureau of Control" (FBC) while searching for her younger brother Dylan, who was taken by the organization following a paranormal incident during their childhood. Chosen as director of the Bureau by extradimensional entities, she leads its surviving personnel against an invading extradimensional force known as the Hiss.

Jesse was developed as an outsider to the secretive bureaucracy of the FBC and as a contrast to Remedy's earlier video game protagonists. Her prior experience with paranormal phenomena was intended to make her more accepting of the Oldest House and the supernatural powers she acquires there. Hope based aspects of her performance on Jesse's isolation and attachment to her family and cited Vera Farmiga's performance in The Conjuring as an influence.

Critical discussion of Jesse has focused on her confidence, exercise of institutional and supernatural power, and relationship with the player. Academics have discussed Jesse as a representation of women negotiating workplace hierarchy and feminist themes, while her relationships with the player and the supernatural entity Polaris is examined as an example of a "coinhabited avatar". Hope won the Great White Way Award for Best Acting in a Game at the 9th New York Game Awards for her portrayal of Jesse.

== Concept and creation ==
Jesse Faden is Remedy Entertainment's first female lead character. Through Jesse, the player is intended to experience how a mostly ordinary person deals with the extraordinary and connects with the supernatural on her own terms. Creative director Sam Lake described her as someone who entered the bureau seeking answers about inexplicable events from her childhood; because of Jesse's personal history with paranormal phenomena, she would not approach the Oldest House from an entirely conventional understanding of reality.

Lake also contrasted Jesse, a young outsider entering an unfamiliar institution, with former director Zachariah Trench and the established culture of the FBC, which he described as an "old boy's club". Although Jesse becomes director shortly after entering its headquarters, she remains suspicious of the organization because of its involvement in the disappearance of her brother. Her outsider status was intended to allow the player to discover the bureau alongside her while giving Jesse motivations independent of her newfound institutional role. Narrative designer Brooke Maggs similarly described Jesse as a deliberate contrast to the culture of the Bureau. She characterized the conflict as one between Jesse's practical experience and the FBC's entrenched traditions and procedures. Although Jesse is already familiar with the existence of unexplained phenomena, she knows little about the Bureau itself, allowing her to learn its terminology and institutions alongside the player. Maggs also regarded Jesse's position as Remedy's first female protagonist as only part of the game's approach to representation. She emphasized that Jesse interacts with several other women of different ages, backgrounds and personalities, rather than existing as a lone female lead within a predominantly male cast.

Game director Mikael Kasurinen identified confidence as one of the principles guiding Jesse's characterization. He contrasted her with Alan Wake, whom he viewed as an ordinary person drawn unexpectedly into a supernatural conspiracy. Jesse instead arrives at the Oldest House already aware that conventional explanations of reality are incomplete and adapts quickly to the authority and supernatural abilities she acquires there. Kasurinen said that the development team used her position as director as a guiding principle when determining how she should carry herself. The development team also used Jesse's supernatural abilities to distinguish her from Remedy's earlier protagonists. Kasurinen said that the decision to make the player character herself supernatural was made early in development, but the team wanted the resulting powers to remain visually grounded in the physical environment rather than resemble conventional magic. Consequently, abilities such as Launch, Shield and Jesse's melee attack were designed around manipulating objects, debris and other material in the Oldest House, while Levitate and Evade also expanded her movement through the environment.

Hope had previously portrayed a supporting character in Remedy's Quantum Break, and worked on Control for slightly more than two years. She interpreted Jesse's principal fear as the loss of her remaining family rather than the supernatural phenomena surrounding her. Having lost her parents and spent years separated from Dylan, Hope believed that Jesse was particularly afraid of being left alone and isolated. Within the game, Jesse frequently speaks through internal monologues, initially addressing an unidentified presence as "you". Hope approached these sequences as the behavior of someone accustomed to spending long periods alone and relying on her own thoughts after other people had rejected her account of the paranormal events in her childhood. She said that Jesse's intuition had effectively become her closest companion and tried to make the character's habit of speaking to herself appear natural rather than unusual.

Hope described playing Remedy's first female lead as both an honor and a responsibility. She and Lake discussed how to portray Jesse as a strong female character while making her accessible to players of different genders. Hope cited Vera Farmiga's portrayal of Lorraine Warren in The Conjuring as an influence on the performance, particularly Farmiga's ability to communicate fear while remaining outwardly calm. She similarly regarded Jesse as someone who had already experienced significant trauma before entering the Oldest House and therefore had adapted to confront its supernatural threats without becoming overwhelmed by them.

== Appearances ==
Jesse first appears in Control. As a child living in Ordinary, Maine, she and Dylan discovered a slide projector capable of opening passages to other dimensions. The resulting paranormal event, known in-universe as the "Ordinary AWE" (Altered World Event), caused the disappearance of the town's adult population. The FBC subsequently took Dylan into custody; Jesse escaped and became a drifter, searching for clues as to his whereabouts. During and after the AWE, she is accompanied by "Polaris", a being of unknown origin who guides her telepathically. Her search eventually leads her to the Oldest House, the FBC's headquarters in New York City. Inside, she finds Director Zachariah Trench dead after an apparent suicide. After taking his supernatural "Service Weapon", she is recognized as Trench's successor by the "Board", an unseen collective that oversees the bureau's work. Working with the few surviving bureau personnel, Jesse develops telepathic and telekinetic abilities while working to restore the bureau.

Jesse eventually finds Dylan and learns that the bureau had considered both siblings candidates to become director, but had kept Dylan as a test subject after failing to capture her. Jesse discovers that Dylan has willingly accepted the Hiss and that the invasion threatens to spread beyond the Oldest House. She ultimately loses her apparent connection to Polaris when the Hiss destroys the seemingly benign paranatural entity Hedron, the apparent source of Polaris's resonance within the Oldest House, briefly becoming corrupted herself. Jesse subsequently realizes that Polaris remains present within her, frees herself from the Hiss and prevents Dylan from using the Astral Plane to spread the resonance outside the bureau. Dylan survives but remains comatose, while Jesse becomes contented in her position as director and continues efforts to contain the Hiss within the Oldest House.

In The Foundation, Jesse is summoned into the lowest levels of the Oldest House and prevents the destruction of the "Nail", a key component of the Board, at the hands of Trench's corrupted former deputy, Helen Marshall. While becoming increasingly suspicious of the Board, Jesse's attitude toward her leadership of the FBC itself continues to develop in a positive manner over the course of the story; she becomes more comfortable exercising both her supernatural and managerial authority while considering how to reform an organization that had harmed her family.

In AWE, Jesse investigates the abandoned Investigations Sector after receiving messages from writer Alan Wake. The story connects Control with Remedy's Alan Wake series and involves Jesse confronting and destroying Emil Hartman, a supporting character from the earlier game who has become thoroughly corrupted and transformed into a monstrous figure.

A character based on Jesse appears in the 2024 Alan Wake 2 expansion Night Springs. In the episode "North Star", Hope portrays the "Sibling", an alternate-fiction version of Jesse who searches for her missing brother at the Coffee World amusement park. The protagonists of Night Springs are intended to be fictional echoes inspired by people Alan Wake had encountered or observed, rather than the characters themselves.

Jesse is a major character in Control Resonant, a sequel to Control released in September 2026. The game shifts the role of player character to her brother Dylan, taking place seven years after the events of Control. Jesse has disappeared while a supernatural crisis spreads through Manhattan, New York, and Dylan is released by the FBC to confront the threat and search for his sister.

== Reception and analysis ==
=== Critical reception ===
Critical discussion of Jesse has frequently focused on her confidence and relationship with power. Gita Jackson of Kotaku described Jesse as a power fantasy different from those she had encountered in other action games. Jackson emphasized the character's physical presence rather than simply her appearance, pointing to the effort conveyed by Jesse's movements while levitating and the apparent weight of objects manipulated through telekinesis. She argued that these elements make Jesse's supernatural power feel tangible rather than effortless. Jackson also connected Jesse's appeal to her institutional authority. She observed that the Oldest House responds to Jesse and that bureau personnel generally accept her position as director instead of repeatedly challenging her right to hold it. Jackson interpreted the combination of physical and social authority as particularly significant for a female protagonist, arguing that Jesse's confidence and the assumption that she is entitled to exercise power distinguish her from more conventional presentations of women in games.

Sam Barsanti of The A.V. Club focused on the ambiguity between Jesse, Polaris and the player. He considered the early suggestion that Jesse's internal remarks might be directed toward the player an effective misdirection, but regarded the later possibility that Polaris was manipulating her as one of the weaker strands of the story because neither Jesse nor the narrative seriously pursued its implications. Despite that criticism, Barsanti praised Jesse's characterization, particularly her self-assurance and the dynamic created by placing someone already receptive to paranormal phenomena within the institutional culture of the FBC.

Crouse considered Jesse's development as director one of the principal themes of The Foundation. She noted that Jesse enters the FBC as a person harmed by its practices but gradually decides that occupying its highest office gives her an opportunity to change it. At the same time, the expansion makes her increasingly resistant to the Board, whose authority had initially appeared inseparable from her own. Crouse found this development promising but believed the expansion was too short to resolve the political and supernatural questions raised by Jesse's position. Reviewing AWE, Crouse found the expansion stronger in atmosphere and world-building but thought its concentration on Alan Wake left comparatively little space for further development of Jesse's relationships with the entities controlling the Oldest House.

In an essay published by the New York Game Critics Circle, Sarah Doherty Granoff interpreted Jesse through her own experience as an autistic woman. Granoff acknowledged that although neither the game nor Remedy explicitly identify Jesse to be autistic, she associated the character's guarded social behavior, internal analysis of conversations, sensitivity to the Hiss and careful choice of words to be experiences familiar to her. She regarded Jesse as a useful model for how an explicitly autistic woman might be depicted in a future game because the traits she identified were integrated into the character without being presented solely as strengths or deficiencies.

Jesse was nominated for Outstanding Achievement in Character at the 23rd Annual D.I.C.E. Awards, with the Academy of Interactive Arts & Sciences crediting Lake as writer and Hope as voice actor. Hope won the Great White Way Award for Best Acting in a Game for her performance as Jesse at the 9th Annual New York Game Awards which were held on January 21, 2020. Hope was also nominated for Performer in a Leading Role at the 2020 British Academy Games Awards.

=== Themes and analysis ===
Contemporary criticism examined Jesse through the hierarchy she inherits. Cameron Kunzelman of Vice interpreted the FBC as a literalized corporate bureaucracy in which the Director's authority ultimately derives from the Board. Because Jesse can bind Objects of Power, including the Service Weapon, only with the Board's approval, Kunzelman argued that the game turns the normally symbolic relationship between a board and an executive into a supernatural one. He characterized Jesse's position as less an equal partnership than one in which the Board grants her power while treating the Director as an instrument for acting on its behalf.

Media scholar Poppy Wilde devoted a chapter of the 2024 collection Working Women on Screen: Paid Labour and Fourth Wave Feminism to Jesse and the representation of women at work in Control. Wilde approaches the FBC as both a supernatural environment and a workplace, examining Jesse's sudden placement at the top of an existing hierarchy and the tension between the authority implied by her title and the labor continually demanded of her. Her analysis considers Jesse through fourth-wave feminism and neoliberal subject formation, asking how the character both participates in and resists the values of the institution she inherits. Wilde interprets Jesse's visual design as part of this relationship with institutional power. Jesse initially wears practical civilian clothing that neither sexualizes her nor associates her visually with the uniforms and formal dress of FBC personnel. Wilde prefers the term "unsexualised" to "desexualised", reasoning that the latter assumes that sexualization was the state from which Jesse had been removed. She argues that Jesse's civilian clothing therefore rejects both sexualized and corporate forms of presentation.

Jesse's attitude toward social status provides another part of Wilde's analysis. Although she becomes director of the FBC, Jesse says that she feels more at home having worked as a janitor and repeatedly asks personnel to call her by her first name rather than her title. Wilde contrasts her attitude with bureau employees who openly attach prestige to executive work and look down upon maintenance personnel. Jesse instead identifies readily with Ahti, maintenance chief Simon Arish and other workers whose formal positions are below her own. Wilde interprets these relationships, which are based on trust rather than romance, as reflecting fourth-wave ideals of male–female camaraderie and resistance to rigid hierarchies. Wilde also considers Jesse's relationship with operations chief Helen Marshall. Although Jesse formally outranks her, she recognizes Marshall's experience and repeatedly accepts her direction or guidance when immediate threats to bureau personnel take priority over Jesse's search for Dylan. Wilde argues that Jesse's willingness to defer to another woman with relevant expertise complicates the assumption that occupying the position of director makes her intrinsically superior to those around her.

At the same time, Wilde argues that the mechanics of Control reproduce some of the neoliberal values its narrative complicates. Jesse continually increases her abilities, accumulates resources and becomes more valuable as a playable avatar through work. Her formal status also does not free her from labor: subordinate employees repeatedly assign tasks to the director, and much of the game consists of Jesse fixing problems inherited from other people. Wilde identifies two possible readings of this arrangement. Jesse's willingness to assist personnel across the organization can represent solidarity and a rejection of institutional hierarchy, but it can also resemble the disproportionate expectation that women in positions of authority perform additional work to prove their competence. Wilde further applies the concept of the "glass cliff" to Jesse's appointment. Jesse receives the bureau's highest office at precisely the moment the organization is undergoing an existential crisis, leaving her responsible for repairing a disaster created before she arrived. Even after the immediate threat is contained, her work is not finished and the Oldest House remains infested by the Hiss. Wilde concludes that Jesse combines characteristics conventionally coded as masculine and feminine, including violence, vulnerability, authority and care for others, while remaining subject to the workplace structures she attempts to reform.

Game scholar P. S. Berge has analyzed Jesse from a different perspective, focusing on the relationship between protagonist and player. In a 2021 paper comparing Control with Hellblade: Senua's Sacrifice, Berge describes Jesse and Senua as "coinhabited avatars": established protagonists whose bodies and narratives are influenced by entities other than the player. Berge argues that this structure creates "outmersive" moments that interrupt uncomplicated identification between player and avatar and encourage the player to question where their own agency begins and ends. Berge identifies Jesse's repeated use of the second-person "you" as one way Control destabilizes that relationship. At the beginning of the game the referent is deliberately unclear. Jesse appears to be addressing an unseen presence, but her statements can simultaneously appear directed at the person controlling her actions. The game later identifies the presence as Polaris, an extradimensional entity that has accompanied Jesse since the Ordinary incident. Polaris also performs functions associated with the player interface, appearing over objectives and guiding Jesse through the environment. Berge therefore describes Polaris as both a character within Jesse's story and a surrogate for the player's influence over her. This relationship becomes more unstable when Dylan tells Jesse that Polaris is manipulating her. Berge argues that the accusation also implicates the player, who has been following Polaris's guidance while controlling Jesse. By separating Jesse, Polaris and the player rather than treating them as a single source of agency, Control prevents Jesse from functioning merely as an empty body occupied by the player and gives her a distinct claim to her own narrative.

Berge identifies the game's false ending as a more direct challenge to player control. After the destruction of Hedron, Jesse is possessed by the Hiss and corrupted credits appear to signal that the game has ended. The game then resumes with Jesse stripped of her powers and reduced to performing mundane office work while other characters behave as though she had never been director. Berge argues that the sequence removes the agency accumulated by both Jesse and the player and connects their shared helplessness to the game's broader themes of deception and institutional control. Jesse ultimately recovers by locating Polaris within herself rather than receiving authority from the Board or another external source. For Berge, these techniques make the player themselves another object of suspicion within Control. Jesse remains a character in whom the player has a stake without becoming simply interchangeable with the person holding the controller. The resulting uncertainty over who controls whom reinforces the game's preoccupation with investigation, conspiracy and competing forms of authority.

== Bibliography ==
- Berge, P. S. (2021). "Rotten and Possessed: Control and Hellblade: Senua's Sacrifice as Models of Outmersive Game Design". Proceedings of the 32nd ACM Conference on Hypertext and Social Media. New York: Association for Computing Machinery. pp. 35–44. doi:10.1145/3465336.3475094. ISBN 978-1-4503-8551-0.
- Wilde, Poppy (2024). "Who's in Control?: Negotiating Hierarchies, Neoliberal Subjectivation, and Feminist Resistance in the World of Work". In Tomsett, Ellie; Weidhase, Nathalie; Wilde, Poppy (eds.). Working Women on Screen: Paid Labour and Fourth Wave Feminism. Palgrave Studies in (Re)Presenting Gender. Cham: Palgrave Macmillan. pp. 169–191. doi:10.1007/978-3-031-49576-2_8. ISBN 978-3-031-49576-2.
