= Control Resonant =

2026 video game

- Developer: Remedy Entertainment
- Publisher: Remedy Entertainment
- Director: Mikael Kasurinen
- Producer: Juha Vainio
- Designers: Sergey Mohov; Anne-Marie Grönroos; Leonid Stepanov
- Programmer: Sean Donnelly
- Artist: Elmeri Raitanen
- Writers: Ashley Smith; Mikael Kasurinen
- Composer: Petri Alanko
- Engine: Northlight Engine
- Platforms: PlayStation 5; Windows; Xbox Series X/S; macOS
- Release: PlayStation 5, Windows, Xbox Series X/S; 24 September 2026; macOS; 2026
- Genre: Action role-playing
- Mode: Single-player

Control Resonant is a 2026 action role-playing game developed and published by Remedy Entertainment. It is a sequel to the 2019 game Control and was released for PlayStation 5, Windows, and Xbox Series X/S on 24 September 2026, and will release for macOS later in 2026. The game received generally positive reviews from critics.

The story follows Dylan Faden, a paranaturally abled "parautilitarian" who first appeared as a supporting character in Control, as he battles an invasion of hostile entities while searching for his estranged sister Jesse Faden.

== Plot ==
Seven years after the Hiss invasion of the Oldest House, Federal Bureau of Control Director Jesse Faden awakens her comatose brother Dylan by stabbing him with the Aberrant, an Object of Power, before disappearing. Dylan is subsequently recruited by the Board to help deal with the current crisis, as the FBC's HRA defenses have inexplicably failed, allowing the Hiss to breach the Oldest House's lockdown and escape into the outside world. He makes contact with FBC agent Zoe de Vera, who explains that the Hiss escaped while the FBC was dealing with another Altered World Event dubbed the "Patterning", which has cut off Manhattan from the rest of the world and is rapidly warping reality. With the Aberrant, Dylan kills a number of Hiss as well as a paranatural entity called "The Artist" which appears to be hostile to the Hiss. Realizing the severity of the situation, Zoe orders Dylan to report back to the Oldest House for orders.

Dylan meets with the Acting co-Director, Head of Research Emily Pope, who allows Dylan to remain free to assist the FBC on the condition he wear a Mobile Containment Device that can remotely incapacitate or kill him. Pope explains that the Patterning appears to be diametrically opposed to the Hiss which she hopes can be weaponized if they can reverse-engineer it. To that end, Pope instructs Dylan to hunt down paranatural entities mutated by the Patterning, dubbed "Resonant Entities", to analyze them. Zoe is assigned to be Dylan's handler and is given control of his MCD. Dylan then proceeds to rescue the second Acting co-Director, security chief Simon Arish. However, Arish is hateful of Dylan, and remains suspicious of him due to his role in the original Hiss invasion. After Dylan eliminates enough Resonant Entities, Pope develops a Cancellation Field Device that will hopefully eliminate the Hiss. Dylan is ordered to place the CFD in an underground area called the Sinkhole, but ends up being trapped. Zoe disobeys Arish's orders and rescues Dylan.

Zoe is suspended and Arish pushes for the premature activation of the CFD, but the test fire goes awry and accelerates the Patterning, killing many. Arish is indefinitely suspended, making Pope the full Acting Director. She reinstates Zoe and assigns Dylan to investigate the disappearance of a science team researching the Patterning. He recovers their data and discovers that the Patterning can not only warp reality, but time as well, and it is attempting to invade the Oldest House. During his travels, he also finds himself occasionally transported into the space between dimensions via Dimensional Faults, where he encounters Jesse who is sealing Faults to prevent the entity behind the Patterning from invading Earth. Jesse is distraught at seeing Dylan working for the FBC, as she intended for him to escape to live his own life. She remains in the space between dimensions while Dylan returns to the physical plane to seal the final Fault inside the Oldest House.

Dylan heads for the Fault, which is located in the Prime Candidate testing area where he confronts memories of the harsh training and abuse he underwent at the hands of former FBC head of research Casper Darling and former director Zachariah Trench. He and Jesse are unable to close the Fault and the Patterning breaches the Oldest House. Arish is caught in the crossfire and becomes a Resonant himself, forcing Dylan to kill him. Pope explains that the Patterning is the result of a new Hedron, a transdimensional entity ontologically opposed to the Hiss. Unlike Polaris, this Hedron is in its prime and likely arrived on Earth to destroy the Hiss infestation regardless of the collateral damage it will cause to humanity. The Hedron attempts to kill Dylan by destroying his mind, but he is able to reconstruct it and takes the fight directly to the Hedron, killing it against the Board's orders. Dylan then seemingly dies from the effort, but Jesse manages to revive him again at the cost of falling into a coma.

With the Hedron's death, the Patterning around Manhattan begins to slowly but surely dissipate. Dylan's civil rights are restored, he is given his own apartment in New York City and he decides to become an FBC contractor, swearing to find a way to wake Jesse from her coma. Later, he overhears Pope confess her love for his sister while standing beside her gurney.

The FBC also digs up a lost video recorded by Darling shortly before the Hiss invasion, which they give to Dylan; in it, Darling expresses regret over his treatment of Dylan, suggesting he internalized abusive behavior from his own childhood, but ultimately justifies his actions due to Trench's Hiss corruption while admitting that it's too late to make amends. In another secret video unlocked by completing the new game plus mode, an intoxicated and hallucinating Darling rants about Trench's refusal to send the FBC after Jesse while citing the Board's instructions to keep the Faden siblings separated. He expresses frustration at his failure in finding records of the Faden siblings outside of their hometown of Ordinary, Maine, and questions the Board's choice of words, wondering why they used the term "separated" instead of "apart"; numerous sources across both games all but confirm that Jesse and Dylan were once one person.

== Development ==
In June 2021, Remedy Entertainment announced an agreement with 505 Games, the publisher of its 2019 game Control, to develop FBC: Firebreak, a multiplayer spin-off, and a "bigger-budget" project expanding the Control series. In May 2022, the latter project was referenced under the codename "Heron" in Remedy's development roadmap. In November, the company confirmed that "Heron" was a sequel to Control and unveiled the first concept art. Remedy announced a co-development and co-publishing deal with 505 Games for the title. In February 2024, Remedy acquired full ownership of the Control series from 505 Games for €17 million. In August, the company partnered with Annapurna Pictures to finance half of the sequel's development costs. By that month, the game had reached the "production readiness stage". In October, Control 2 was teased during an optional scene in the Alan Wake 2 expansion The Lake House. Control 2's full production began in February 2025. According to Remedy's annual report published in March, this phase is expected to last between 15 and 26 months, with a team size ranging from over 75 to 200 employees. The initial development budget for the sequel is €50 million. Remedy estimated that the game would need to sell between 3 and 4 million lifetime copies to reach a 100% return on investment.

In March 2026, it was reported that Control Resonant was in the alpha development stage. On 18 August 2026, Remedy announced that Control Resonant had "gone gold".

=== Gameplay ===
Development on Resonant's gameplay was undertaken by Remedy's largest design team. Control Resonant is an action role-playing game, with Remedy stating that they are "holding on to key tenets of storytelling and spectacle" from the first game while increasing player agency, exploration, and role-playing mechanics in the sequel. Remedy had intended for the Control series to be role-playing games as the first game introduced side quests and dialogue choices but discarded core role-playing gameplay systems such as skill trees or character build systems. Game director Mikael Kasurinen said that Control Resonant "fully commit[s]" to being an action role-playing game with its addition of character statistics, multiple talent trees and customisable weapons. Remedy communications director Thomas Puha called Control Resonant's shift towards more action role-playing elements as a "a natural progression" for the studio.

Resonant had a significantly different approach to its gameplay and storytelling perspective, shifting its combat model from a third-person shooter to being melee-focused and starring Dylan Faden as its lead protagonist, the sibling of protagonist Jesse Faden from the first game. Kasurinen said that Control and Control Resonant "stand on their own feet, and they are like expressions of the two different siblings". Dylan's weapon, called the Aberrant, is an expression of his different personality compared to Jesse's Service Weapon. The Aberrant is able to shift into different forms with Dylan able to equip a total of three melee weapons with their own use cases. Sergey Mohov served as the lead gameplay designer for Resonant. According to Mohov, Control Resonant is not an open world game but there are a number of "large, distinct, and expansive zones filled with side activities, hidden encounters, and optional discoveries".

Dylan uses supernatural abilities to traverse environments affected by altered gravity. His shift ability allows him to redirect his movement through these areas. Defeating boss enemies known as Resonants unlocks additional supernatural combat abilities.

=== Narrative ===
Control Resonant is a narrative sequel taking place after the events of Control (2019). Remedy wanted the narrative to remain accessible to players who had not played the first game. With the Control series, Kasurinen said the studio saw each game as representing "a lens into that world through different protagonists". Remedy had always planned to create a game with Dylan as the protagonist but art director Elmeri Raitanen stressed that Remedy first sought to create the world of Control from a high-level as it "creates more organic characters". Kasurinen said that Control Resonant was "deeply" inspired by Attack on Titan and Neon Genesis Evangelion that acted as narrative touchpoints.

=== Technology ===
Control Resonant is being developed in Remedy's in-house Northlight Engine. With 2023's Alan Wake 2, Remedy reoriented its Northlight engine towards GPU-driven rendering, introducing mesh shaders and more accurate, single-pixel occlusion culling techniques to achieve greater levels of geometric detail and path traced lighting. Control primarily took place indoors with the many reflective materials contained in the Oldest House's brutalist interior, Control Resonant takes place in larger outdoor areas in Manhattan with more diffused materials.

Control Resonant supports path tracing on PC with Remedy collaborating with Nvidia on its implementation. Alongside path tracing, Remedy integrated Nvidia's RTX Mega Geometry system that accelerates the building of bounding volume hierarchies (BVHs) during ray tracing with high levels of geometry. Higher detail is enabled through using nested cluster triangles, known as Cluster-Level Acceleration Structures (CLAS), within a BVH, rather than the lower-resolution proxies for geometry normally included in ray tracing BVHs. The building of new BVHs when there is an LOD change is sped up through reconstructing BVHs with only the affected CLAS, reducing CPU overhead from BVH updates and management. Remedy previously added RTX Mega Geometry to Alan Wake 2 in January 2025.

== Release ==
Control Resonant was announced at the Game Awards in December 2025 with a scheduled release in 2026 for macOS, PlayStation 5, Windows, and Xbox Series X/S. During PlayStation's State of Play presentation on 12 February 2026, a gameplay trailer for Control Resonant was shown. On 2 June 2026, a trailer at a State of Play presentation announced Control Resonant's release date. The trailer released on 5 June 2026, features song "Manalan mailla" ("In the Lands of the Underworld") by Finnish singer Vilma Jää.

Control Resonant was released digitally on 24 September 2026 for PlayStation 5, Windows, and Xbox Series X/S with the physical release for PlayStation 5 and Xbox Series X/S coming on 15 October. Control Resonant's Deluxe Edition grants 48-hour early access exclusively on PlayStation 5, beginning on 22 September. Communications director Thomas Puha acknowledged that Control Resonant's busy September release is "challenging" due to competition from other titles releasing close to it like Silent Hill: Townfall, Marvel's Wolverine and Onimusha: Way of the Sword. To support the game, Remedy planned its largest marketing campaign. The macOS version is scheduled for later in 2026.

== Reception ==
Reception

Aggregate scores
Aggregator	Score
Metacritic	(PC) 83/100 (PS5) 83/100 (XSXS) 81/100
OpenCritic	86% recommend

Review scores
Publication	Score
Destructoid	9/10
Eurogamer	3/5
GameSpot	9/10
GamesRadar+	3/5
Giant Bomb	4.5/5
IGN	8/10
PC Gamer (US)	76/100
PCGamesN	9/10
Push Square	8/10
RPGamer	4/5
Video Games Chronicle	5/5

Control Resonant received "generally favorable" reviews, according to review aggregator website Metacritic, with OpenCritic reporting that 86% of critics recommended the game. IGN gave the game an 8 out of 10, complimenting its combat system and design while noting that the late game can be tedious. IGN also wrote that the role-playing game mechanics offer some flexibility but are lacking in depth. The New York Times published a review which praised the game's portrayal of Manhattan and its potential for exploration, and also that there is a disconnect between the gameplay and storytelling: story and character development are bound to "cut scenes and flashbacks with stiff, unnatural performances", with the gameplay mostly focusing on combat. The Guardian compared the game's design to the 2010 film Inception, remarked that movement and exploration are high points, and wrote that the game "has made a tonal shift towards easily digestible mainstream convention" when compared to its predecessor.

=== Sales ===
The game sold more than 1 million copies in 3 weeks and became Remedy Entertainment's fastest selling video game.

=== Awards ===
Year	Award	Category	Result	Ref.
2026	Golden Joystick Awards	Ultimate Game of the Year	Nominated	
2026	Golden Joystick Awards	Best Supporting Performer (Frankie Kevich)	Nominated	
2026	Golden Joystick Awards	Best Visual Design	Won	
2026	The Game Awards 2026	Game of the Year	Pending	
2026	The Game Awards 2026	Best Game Direction	Pending	
2026	The Game Awards 2026	Best Narrative	Pending	
2026	The Game Awards 2026	Best Art Direction	Pending	
2026	The Game Awards 2026	Best Audio Design	Pending	
2026	The Game Awards 2026	Best Action/Adventure Game	Pending	
