= Alan Wake 2 =

2023 video game

- Developer: Remedy Entertainment
- Publisher: Epic Games Publishing
- Directors: Sam Lake; Kyle Rowley
- Producer: Joonas Tamminen
- Programmer: Antti Kerminen
- Artist: Janne Pulkkinen
- Writers: Sam Lake; Clay Murphy; Tyler Burton Smith; Sinikka Annala
- Composer: Petri Alanko
- Series: Alan Wake
- Engine: Northlight Engine
- Platforms: PlayStation 5; Windows; Xbox Series X/S
- Release: 27 October 2023
- Genre: Survival horror
- Mode: Single-player

Alan Wake 2 (Note: Stylized as Alan Wake II) is a 2023 survival horror video game developed by Remedy Entertainment and published by Epic Games Publishing. The sequel to Alan Wake (2010), the story follows best-selling novelist Alan Wake, who has been trapped in an alternate dimension for 13 years, as he attempts to escape by writing a horror story involving an FBI Special Agent named Saga Anderson.

Alan Wake 2 was released for PlayStation 5, Windows, and Xbox Series X/S on 27 October 2023. The game's development and marketing budget reportedly was €70 million, making it one of the most expensive games to develop and one of the most expensive cultural products from Finland. Alan Wake 2 received generally positive reviews from critics and was nominated for multiple Game of the Year awards. It had sold over 2 million units by December 2024, making it Remedy's fastest-selling game. A downloadable content (DLC) expansion titled Night Springs was released on 8 June 2024, while a second expansion titled The Lake House was released on 22 October 2024.

== Gameplay ==
The player, as Saga, fights an enemy using a pistol and a flashlight. The ammo counter, health bar, and flashlight meter are visible at the bottom right.

Compared to the original Alan Wake, which is an action-adventure game with horror themes, Alan Wake 2 is a survival horror game; it is still played from a third-person perspective. Players play as Alan Wake or Saga Anderson in two separate single-player stories, which can be played in any order the player chooses, although the opening and ending sequences of the game are linear.

Wake and Anderson traverse environments and fight enemies using various firearms and a flashlight, the latter of which can be "focused" to render enemies vulnerable to firearm attacks. Focusing the flashlight drains its battery, and players need to strategically use a limited amount of batteries and ammunition in order to survive. When enemies are close, Alan or Saga can perform a dodge maneuver.

Alan Wake 2 incorporates detective elements: when playing as Saga, players can access an enemy-free space dubbed the "Mind Place". Described by Remedy as a "3D menu", the Mind Place is a visual representation of Saga's thoughts. In the Mind Place, players manage a pin board in which they can connect clues to piece together the main mystery, as well as profile characters to gather clues. As Alan, players have access to the "Writer's Room", where they can see the outline of a novel he is writing. By adding and changing plot details on the outline, they are able to manipulate the space around Alan. Both the Mind Place and the Writer's Room do not pause the outside world.

A returning element from Alan Wake is finding manuscript pages that foreshadow upcoming events in the story.

== Synopsis ==
=== Plot ===
FBI agent Saga Anderson, known for her intuitive skills, arrives in Bright Falls with partner Alex Casey to investigate ritualistic murders linked to the Cult of the Tree. Their latest victim is Robert Nightingale, a fellow agent who went missing in a mass incident that occurred in the town in 2010 and was largely covered up by the US government. During the autopsy, Nightingale's corpse reanimates and escapes. Guided by mysterious typewritten pages that seem to predict events, Saga hunts Nightingale through the Cauldron Lake woods and kills him, then finds missing novelist Alan Wake washed ashore, warning of his evil doppelgänger, Mr. Scratch. Back in town, Alan recounts his 13 years trapped in the Dark Place—a dimension tied to the lake and ruled by the Dark Presence, which manifests as Scratch. Alan has tried to escape by writing stories that alter reality, but his attempts always loop back to an apparition of his New York apartment with his wife Alice. Video diaries left by Alice in the apartment suggest she is also haunted by Scratch.

Alan eventually writes a story called Return about Saga's investigation, but realizes it has been twisted by Scratch. He warns Saga that Scratch is seeking the Clicker, a supernatural artifact capable of freeing or destroying the Dark Presence. As Return unfolds, Saga discovers her past has been rewritten so that her daughter Logan drowned. Determined to end the story, she retrieves the Clicker but is intercepted by the Federal Bureau of Control (FBC), led by Agent Kiran Estevez, who apprehends Alan and the Cult leaders, Ilmo and Jaakko Koskela.

Saga learns from Odin and Tor Anderson—her grand-uncle and grandfather—that her psychic abilities allow her to perceive changes in reality caused by Return. When she attempts to give Alan the Clicker, he kills Jaakko and attacks Saga, convincing her he is actually Scratch. Using FBC light tech, she drives him off. Ilmo, grieving his brother, reveals the Cult's purpose was to defend Bright Falls from the Taken, humans possessed by the Dark Presence. Saga joins forces with Casey, Estevez, Odin, and Tor to summon the real Alan from the Dark Place using the Clicker.

In the Dark Place, Alan learns from his future self that his endless rewrites have created time loops. He discovers a suicide note from Alice and realizes the haunting was caused by his repeated trips to the apartment. Mistaking his past self for Scratch, an enraged Alan kills him, perpetuating the cycle. His despair allows the Dark Presence to possess him, and he subsequently disappears.

The ritual succeeds in bringing Alan back, but at an earlier point in the story, with the Dark Presence inside of him waiting to take over. The possessed Alan attacks the group. Saga and Estevez banish the Dark Presence from Alan, but it transfers to Casey, steals the Clicker, and throws Saga into the Dark Place. Alan re-enters the Dark Place to write a new ending, while Saga learns to navigate the realm, retrieves the Clicker and a Bullet of Light, and reunites with Alan to complete the story.

Saga uses the Clicker to purge Casey. Alan provokes the Dark Presence into possessing him again, and Saga shoots him with the Bullet of Light, seemingly destroying both Alan and the entity. As he dies, Alan realizes the story is trapped in a loop and will reset. Saga calls Logan to see if reality has been restored, but the screen cuts to black.

In a final video diary, Alice reveals she tricked Alan into believing she had died, explaining that he must break the cycle through “destruction” or “ascension.” Alan revives, declaring, “It's not a loop, it's a spiral.”

In the New Game Plus mode, The Final Draft, repeated playthroughs bring the spiral to its end. Alan finishes Return, severing the Dark Presence, which was born from his own darkness and tied to Alice. The Bullet of Light destroys it permanently. Logan answers Saga's call, and Alan revives, free from the loop, proclaiming himself "the master of many worlds.”

=== Expansions ===
==== Night Springs ====
Within the Remedy Connected Universe, Night Springs was a horror anthology show akin to The Twilight Zone, which had a few episodes written by Alan himself. Previously used during American Nightmare in a failed attempt to escape the Dark Place, a new season hosted by Warlin Door, a mysterious figure in the Dark Place who accosts Alan during the start of his chapters, covers three short and mostly disconnected stories featuring familiar faces from both Alan Wake and Control - it's implied that these were earlier drafts of Alan's that he rejected in favor of what would become the final version of Control and Return, given the parallels between each story:

Number One Fan: A pastiche of poorly-written self-insert power fantasies, the Number One Fan (Rose Marigold) fights through hordes of rabid critics in order to save her beloved writer (Alan Wake) from his evil twin (Mr. Scratch). Notably, the evil twin attempts to impersonate the writer at one point; this makes it into Return as Scratch hiding in Alan before he tries to take the Clicker from Saga.

North Star: Effectively a cut-down retelling of Control, the Sibling (Jesse Faden) is led to a coffee-themed amusement park, secretly a cover for a paranormal government agency, by her Guiding Star (Polaris), to search for her long-lost brother (physically Alan Wake, voice by Dylan Faden/Sean Durrie), only to find the park taken over by an corruptive and alien force imbued within the park's coffee (the Hiss).

Time Breaker: Actor Shawn Ashmore (who plays Tim Breaker in the main game) seemingly finds his own dead body in his dressing room while starring in a videogame developed by Poison Pill Entertainment (parodying Remedy), subsequently becoming embroiled in a multiversal conflict between the Ripple Effect Corporation, spearheaded by Agent Jesbet (Jesse) and Ashmore's many counterparts, and the Master of Many Worlds (Warlin Door & Alan Wake). Notably, a number of elements both in the base game and Time Breaker imply that Tim Breaker, Jesse Faden, and Warlin Door are alternate versions of characters in Quantum Break.

==== The Lake House ====
After Alan washes up to shore from the Clicker ritual, the FBC is alerted to an Altered World Event occurring; Kiran Estevez and her team travel to a research facility dedicated to studying Cauldron Lake, the eponymous Lake House, to gather information and additional manpower in order to coordinate a response, only to find it under a state of emergency and seemingly abandoned. Estevez quickly finds out that the Dark Presence has managed to take over the facility - along with its two married heads, Jules and Diana Marmont, whose Taken forms subsequently slaughter the rest of her team.

As the agent ventures further into the facility, Estevez discovers that the Marmonts began to chafe within their marriage and the continued stresses of running the Lake House, and exploited the Oldest House's continued lockdown to conduct increasingly unethical and deranged experiments with no oversight in an effort to one-up each other; Jules attempted to exploit the Dark Presence's abilities by abusing and drugging Rudolf Lane, artist and former patient of Emil Hartman, while Diana believed that attempting to emulate Alan Wake's writing style via automated typewriters and later "conscripting" a ghostwriter under false pretenses would better harness the reality-shaping effects of Cauldron Lake. Eventually, Rudolf broke and committed ritualistic suicide, using his own blood to paint a final, horrific self-portrait, the Painting, which was infused with his hatred and despair; Jules then used the Painting to open a Threshold directly into the Dark Place; the raw emotions within the Painting resonated with the Dark Presence, resulting in the entire facility being Taken. Estevez also encounters Dylan Faden after briefly being transported to the Oldest House via the Oceanview Motel, where he warns her of an upcoming cataclysm in New York City.

Estevez eventually makes her way into the lower levels where the Painting is held, only to witness Jules having his head caved in by his wife, their sheer hatred for each other briefly overpowering the Dark Presence, before Estevez finishes off Diana herself and seals the Painting's Threshold. She then witnesses a vision of Alan writing about their later confrontation at Saga and Casey's safehouse following the Cult of the Tree's attack, and sets it in motion by calling what she learnt in, as a "good tip, nothing more", to her backup.

== Development ==
=== Pre-production ===
Remedy Entertainment released Alan Wake in 2010. Learning from Max Payne, they wrote Alan Wake in a way that allows additional story to be told through sequels and further installments. The team began discussing sequel ideas after Alan Wake was shipped, which would continue to star Alan Wake as the protagonist, but also explore the stories of the supporting characters including Wake's friend Barry Wheeler and Sheriff Sarah Breaker. A prototype was created to show off the gameplay of Alan Wake 2 when the studio was showing the game to potential publishers. The game would have been a direct sequel to Alan Wake, featuring new enemies and new gameplay mechanics, such as being able to rewrite reality, which were showcased in the prototype. Ultimately, Remedy pitched the project to Alan Wake publisher Microsoft Studios. Microsoft, however, at the time was not interested in a sequel and instead, tasked Remedy to create a new game. This ultimately became Quantum Break, released in 2016. It included, alongside other easter eggs to Alan Wake, a short live-action film, titled Alan Wake: Return. It features two FBI agents, one named Alex Casey, investigating the reappearance of Wake, which had been created by Remedy as to help promote a sequel to publishers. The other FBI agent was Saga Anderson, who was portrayed by Malla Malmivaara. She was later recast with Melanie Liburd. Most of the ideas for Alan Wake 2 were implemented in American Nightmare, a downloadable follow-up to Alan Wake. Remedy CEO Tero Virtala stated that any further sequels to Alan Wake would require Microsoft Studios' approval as the publishing rights holder, though Remedy otherwise owns all other intellectual property rights to the series.

When Quantum Break was announced, Sam Lake explained that a sequel to Alan Wake had been postponed, and that Alan Wake was not financially successful enough to receive the funding they needed to continue developing the sequel at the time. Director of communications Thomas Puha stated in April 2019 that Remedy had briefly returned to work on an Alan Wake property about two years prior, but the effort did not work out, and the company was booked for the next few years, between their own new game Control, supporting Smilegate on its game CrossfireX, and another new project. Puha said that the only limited factor for them to work on an Alan Wake sequel was "time, money, and resources". Despite that, Lake continued to be part of a team in Remedy to brainstorm ideas and work on different incarnations for Alan Wake 2. Internally, the project was code-named "Project Big Fish", which represented its importance and significance to Remedy. In the second downloadable content pack for Control, Remedy's next game following Quantum Break, Alan Wake was featured as a character. According to Remedy, Control established the "Remedy Connected Universe" which is shared by both Control and Alan Wake, and that the next game released by the studio will also be set on this universe.

Remedy fully acquired the rights to Alan Wake from Microsoft in July 2019, including a one-time royalty payment of about €2.5 million for the game series' past sales, which helped pave the way for a sequel. Remedy had signed with Epic Games Publishing in 2021 for the release of two games. Remedy released Alan Wake Remastered in October 2021 as the first game of this partnership, while the second, larger game, Alan Wake 2, was announced at The Game Awards 2021. Remedy's communications director Thomas Puha said that Epic allowed Remedy to create the game they wanted to make with minimal publisher interference, while providing extensive feedback to help improve the game.

=== Production ===
With Epic as their publisher, Remedy began production on Alan Wake 2 in August 2019. According to Sam Lake, the game would be powered by Remedy's own Northlight Engine, which they used for Quantum Break and Control. Lake also stated that Alan Wake 2 would be a survival horror game, as opposed to Alan Wake, which Lake said was "an action game with horror elements", though he did not explain the difference between the two. Lake further added that players will not need to play the previous games in order to understand Alan Wake 2. The sequel continued to draw inspiration from the works of David Lynch. According to Lake, he sought influence specifically from the third season of Twin Peaks, whereas the first entry was influenced by earlier seasons. Also influential were more detective themes from works like SE7EN, The Silence of the Lambs, and True Detective, while literary influences included House of Leaves by Mark Z. Danielewski, Lunar Park by Bret Easton Ellis, The New York Trilogy by Paul Auster and Stephen King's The Dark Tower series, as well as his memoir On Writing: A Memoir of the Craft. Lake said that his approach to Alan Wake 2 was bolstered by the success of the film Everything Everywhere All At Once.

Remedy confirmed the game would remain in the third-person perspective, and that both Ilkka Villi and Matthew Porretta would return to provide the appearance and the voice of Alan, respectively. Other cast include Melanie Liburd as the live-action and voice of Saga Anderson, David Harewood as both the live-action and voice of Mr. Door, James McCaffrey and Lake as the voice and live-action appearance of Alex Casey, respectively. Further, Alan Wake 2 includes cameos from characters in Control, including Jesse Faden (voiced by Courtney Hope), Dr. Darling (Porretta) and the mysterious janitor Ahti (Martti Suosalo).

Alan's mission "Initiation 4: We Sing" has the player guide Alan through a surreal set while the character Mr. Door and others sing "Herald of Darkness", a musical summarizing Alan's story to that point with music provided by Poets of the Fall (playing as the fictional band "Old Gods of Asgard"). Lake said the idea for the musical sequence was inspired by Alan Wake's concert standoff as well as the Ashtray Maze level in Control, both set to Poets of the Fall's music. Lake also knew that Porretta (Wake) and Harewood (Mr. Door) could sing, and Poets of the Fall were able to help with choreography. Frequently through development, some of the developers questioned the need for the musical sequence due to both the strangeness of the sequence in the horror game and the difficulties in executing it. However, Lake insisted that the sequence must be kept. The song was played live at The Game Awards 2023 by Poets of the Fall, along with Villi, Porretta, Harewood, and Lake reprising their roles.

Overall, the game took 13 years to develop. In an interview, Sam Lake said this was because "The sequel contains many characters and locations, as well as a continuation of the supernatural lore established and introduced in the original Alan Wake."

The budget for the game reportedly stands at €70 million, with €50 million in development and an additional €20 million spent on marketing. This is considered to make the game one of the most expensive cultural products in the history of Finland.

=== Post-launch updates ===
In October 2024, Remedy Entertainment released the free anniversary update for Alan Wake 2, adding accessibility options like infinite ammo, one-shot kills, and gameplay assists. The update added DualSense motion control support and enhanced haptic feedback on PlayStation 5, along with expanded axis inversion options.

==== Graphics technology ====
Prior to the release of Alan Wake 2, Remedy Entertainment had earned a reputation for pushing visual boundaries and graphics technology with releases such as Control and Max Payne 2. Alan Wake 2 was developed with ninth generation consoles in mind. For its traditional graphics rasterization, Alan Wake 2 harnesses mesh shaders that are only supported by the PlayStation 5, Xbox Series X/S, and Nvidia's GeForce RTX 20 and 16 series or AMD's Radeon RX 6000 series of GPUs and later on PC. The game was the first to be released with native support for mesh shaders. As opposed to older vertex and geometry shading techniques, mesh shaders try to reduce the bottleneck from rendering a large number of fixed vertex triangles by instead flexibly rendering large groups of triangles. Developers are given greater control over rendering complex geometry as mesh shaders can be segmented into smaller meshlets that can be re-used and rendered in-parallel while making less calls for data from memory. The graphics pipeline is also shorter with mesh shaders as opposed to a traditional vertex and tessellation pipeline. Alan Wake 2 running on hardware without mesh shader support, such as Nvidia's GeForce GTX 10 series or AMD's Radeon RX 5000 series of GPUs and older, results in poor performance and visual errors. However, an optimization patch released in early 2024 improved performance on GTX 10-series GPUs.

Ray tracing is extensively used in Alan Wake 2 to better simulate how light realistically behaves in the real world. Scenes are lit using global illumination and the light provided by the global light source bounces off surfaces and diffuses depending on the materials present. The use of ray tracing is particularly important for adding ambience to dark scenes in the game that feature flashlights as a sole light source. Alan Wake 2 even goes beyond ray tracing to incorporate path tracing where diffused light will also bounce across duller surfaces in addition to reflective ones. Path tracing's computational demands means that it is not available on the limited console hardware. Alan Wake 2's extensive use of ray tracing made it a promotional vessel for Nvidia's graphics technologies such as supporting DLSS 3.5 Ray Reconstruction. On Nvidia GeForce RTX graphics cards, it seeks to improve ray tracing visual quality and performance by not performing calculations on multiple rays per pixel and instead using machine learning to fill in the gaps.

== Music ==
Alan Wake 2: Original Game Soundtrack

Soundtrack album by Petri Alanko
- Released: 14 May 2024
- Recorded: 2011–2023
- Length: 108:49
- Labels: Epic Games; Laced Records

The original score for Alan Wake 2 by Finnish composer Petri Alanko was released via Epic Games and Laced Records on 14 May 2024, the 14th anniversary of the first Alan Wake game's release. Alanko returns to the role of composer from the first Alan Wake game with his approach to composing for Alan Wake 2 "akin to reuniting with an old friend, discovering both familiar and new elements to play with".

Alanko first began recording Alan Wake 2's original score in 2011, and in the years since then, it became a "very different entity". The biggest change that occurred since Alanko began work on the score was the addition of the game's second protagonist Saga Anderson. In the years since beginning work on Alan Wake 2's score, he also composed the score for Remedy Entertainment's 2019 game Control. To create some of the sounds for Alan Wake 2, Alanko used unconventional means such as dropping pianos off forklift trucks.

== Release ==
Remedy announced in May 2023 that Alan Wake 2 would be a digital-only release, rationalizing that many players had already shifted to only buying games digitally, so they wanted to ensure the game maintains a low price, and they didn't want it to require a separate download even if a physical version was released. Originally planned to release for PlayStation 5, Windows, and Xbox Series X/S on 17 October 2023, Remedy delayed the game by ten days to 27 October to avoid competition from other major triple-A releases. The PC version is exclusive to the Epic Games Store for "a long time". Free downloadable content packs and two paid expansions titled Night Springs and The Lake House were announced. Remedy later announced that physical editions of the game would release in October 2024, including a limited collectors edition produced with Limited Run Games.

=== Marketing ===
An Alan Wake cosmetic outfit was added to Fortnite as part of the "Fortnitemares 2023" event and a retelling of the first Alan Wake was available within Fortnite Creative in the weeks prior to the sequel's release to help new players come up to speed on events from the first game.

From 10 October to 13 November 2023, a free copy of Alan Wake 2 was included in a promotional bundle with the purchase of certain GPUs of Nvidia's GeForce RTX 40 series. The eligible GPUs for the bundle were the RTX 4070, RTX 4070 Ti, RTX 4080 and RTX 4090.

Alan Wake was added to the video game Dead by Daylight in January 2024. Additional cosmetics were included with his release, including skins that turn the character into either Saga Anderson, Rose Marigold, and Mr. Scratch.

=== Downloadable content ===
The first downloadable content (DLC) addition, Night Springs, was released on 8 June 2024. It contains three episodes, featuring echoes of existing characters in the Remedy shared universe in "what if" type scenarios within Bright Falls. These include "Number One Fan," with the player controlling the Waitress, who is based on Rose; the second is "North Star," which features a protagonist based on Jesse Faden, the main character of Control; the third is "Time Breaker," which features the Actor, real-life actor Shawn Ashmore appearing as himself as well as Sheriff Tim Breaker (whom Ashmore also voices).

The second DLC expansion, The Lake House, was released on 22 October 2024. This expansion is a crossover with Remedy's Control series. In The Lake House, players take control of FBC agent Kiran Estevez. While the events of the expansion take place towards the beginning of the main game's plot, players are able to access the expansion from the main menu at any time, or during the mission "Return 6: Scratch", in a similar vein to the Night Springs DLC, which players could enter by finding various television sets around the Dark Place. The game also saw the release of new tracks from Petri Alanko and Poe, as well as a new in-game outfit for Alan, the "classic outfit".

== Reception ==
=== Critical response ===
Reception

Aggregate scores
Aggregator	Score
Metacritic	(PC) 89/100 (PS5) 89/100 (XSXS) 90/100
OpenCritic	93% recommend

Review scores
Publication	Score
Destructoid	9/10
Digital Trends	4/5
Eurogamer	3/5
Game Informer	7.75/10
GameSpot	10/10
GamesRadar+	5/5
Hardcore Gamer	4.5/5
IGN	9/10
NME	5/5
PC Gamer (US)	88/100
PCGamesN	9/10
Push Square	10/10
Shacknews	9/10
The Guardian	4/5
Video Games Chronicle	5/5
VG247	5/5

Alan Wake 2 received "generally favorable" reviews from critics for the PC and PS5 versions, while the Xbox Series X/S version received "universal acclaim", according to review aggregator website Metacritic. OpenCritic determined that 93% of critics recommended the game.

Andrew Farrell of PCGamesN in his Alan Wake 2 review awarded the game 9 out of 10 saying, "Alan Wake 2 is a marvel, serving up intense gameplay, a twisty, dark story, and more secrets and surprises than you could possibly imagine. Remedy has outdone itself here, delivering a truly remarkable experience."

Alan Wake 2 was ranked first on Time's top 10 best video games of 2023 list.

==== Night Springs ====
Night Springs reception

Aggregate scores
Aggregator	Score
Metacritic	(PC) 81/100 (PS5) 85/100
OpenCritic	79% recommend

Review scores
Publication	Score
IGN	8/10
PCMag	4.5/5
Push Square	8/10

Night Springs expansion received "generally favorable" reviews from critics, according to Metacritic. OpenCritic determined that 79% of critics recommended the expansion.

==== The Lake House ====
The Lake House reception

Aggregate scores
Aggregator	Score
Metacritic	(PC) 72/100 (PS5) 77/100
OpenCritic	66% recommend

Review scores
Publication	Score
Eurogamer	3/5
IGN	8/10
Push Square	8/10

The Lake House expansion received "mixed or average" reviews from critics for its Windows version and "generally favorable" reviews for the PlayStation 5 version, according to Metacritic. OpenCritic determined that 66% of critics recommended the expansion.

=== Sales ===
By December 2023, Alan Wake 2 had sold over 1 million units, and by February 2024, had sold over 1.3 million units, making it Remedy's fastest-selling game. It sold more units and over three times more digital units in its first month than Control did in its first four months. As of late April 2024, the game had not recouped its development and marketing costs. In its January–June 2024 financial report, Remedy confirmed that the game still had yet to turn a profit for the company. In the quarterly earnings report on 1 November 2024, the company announced that while the game has not yet started generating royalties, it is close to fully recouping most of the development and marketing costs with ongoing sales. On 19 November, Remedy announced that the game had sold over 1.8 million units. By the end of 2024, it had sold over 2 million units, and started generating royalties for Remedy due to development and marketing costs having been recouped. By the second quarter of 2026, Alan Wake 2 had sold over 3 million copies worldwide.

=== Awards ===
Date	Award	Category	Result	Ref.
2023	Golden Joystick Awards	Critics Choice Award	Won	
2023	Golden Joystick Awards	Best Game Trailer (The Dark Place Gameplay)	Nominated	
2023	Golden Joystick Awards	Best Lead Performer (Ilkka Villi / Matthew Porretta)	Nominated	
2023	Golden Joystick Awards	Best Lead Performer (Melanie Liburd)	Nominated	
2023	Golden Joystick Awards	Ultimate Game of the Year	Nominated	
2023	The Game Awards 2023	Game of the Year	Nominated	
2023	The Game Awards 2023	Best Game Direction	Won	
2023	The Game Awards 2023	Best Narrative	Won	
2023	The Game Awards 2023	Best Art Direction	Won	
2023	The Game Awards 2023	Best Score and Music (Petri Alanko)	Nominated	
2023	The Game Awards 2023	Best Audio Design	Nominated	
2023	The Game Awards 2023	Best Performance (Melanie Liburd)	Nominated	
2023	The Game Awards 2023	Best Action / Adventure Game	Nominated	
2024	13th New York Game Awards	Big Apple Award for Game of the Year	Nominated	
2024	13th New York Game Awards	Herman Melville Award for Best Writing in a Game	Nominated	
2024	13th New York Game Awards	Statue of Liberty Award for Best World	Won	
2024	13th New York Game Awards	Tin Pan Alley Award for Best Music in a Game	Nominated	
2024	13th New York Game Awards	Great White Way Award for Best Acting in a Game (Melanie Liburd as Saga Anderson)	Won	
2024	27th Annual D.I.C.E. Awards	Game of the Year	Nominated	
2024	27th Annual D.I.C.E. Awards	Adventure Game of the Year	Nominated	
2024	27th Annual D.I.C.E. Awards	Outstanding Achievement in Art Direction	Won	
2024	27th Annual D.I.C.E. Awards	Outstanding Achievement in Audio Design	Nominated	
2024	27th Annual D.I.C.E. Awards	Outstanding Achievement in Character (Saga Anderson)	Nominated	
2024	27th Annual D.I.C.E. Awards	Outstanding Achievement in Original Music Composition	Nominated	
2024	27th Annual D.I.C.E. Awards	Outstanding Achievement in Story	Nominated	
2024	27th Annual D.I.C.E. Awards	Outstanding Technical Achievement	Nominated	
2024	22nd Visual Effects Society Awards	Outstanding Visual Effects in a Real-Time Project	Won	
2024	24th Game Developers Choice Awards	Game of the Year	Honorable mention	
2024	24th Game Developers Choice Awards	Best Narrative	Nominated	
2024	24th Game Developers Choice Awards	Best Technology	Nominated	
2024	24th Game Developers Choice Awards	Best Visual Art	Won	
2024	24th Game Developers Choice Awards	Audience Award	Nominated	
2024	20th British Academy Games Awards	Best Game	Nominated	
2024	20th British Academy Games Awards	Animation	Nominated	
2024	20th British Academy Games Awards	Artistic Achievement	Won	
2024	20th British Academy Games Awards	Audio Achievement	Won	
2024	20th British Academy Games Awards	Game Design	Longlisted	
2024	20th British Academy Games Awards	Music	Nominated	
2024	20th British Academy Games Awards	Narrative	Nominated	
2024	20th British Academy Games Awards	Technical Achievement	Nominated	
2024	20th British Academy Games Awards	Performer in a Leading Role (Ilkka Villi as Alan Wake (Live Action + Mocap))	Longlisted	
2024	20th British Academy Games Awards	Performer in a Leading Role (Matthew Porretta as Alan Wake (Voice))	Longlisted	
2024	20th British Academy Games Awards	Performer in a Leading Role (Melanie Liburd as Saga Anderson)	Longlisted	
2024	20th British Academy Games Awards	Performer in a Supporting Role (James McCaffrey as Alex Casey (Voice))	Longlisted	
2024	20th British Academy Games Awards	Performer in a Supporting Role (Martti Suosalo as Ahti)	Longlisted	
2024	20th British Academy Games Awards	Performer in a Supporting Role (Sam Lake as Alex Casey (Live Action + Mocap))	Nominated	
2024	Nebula Awards	Best Game Writing (Sam Lake, Clay Murphy, Tyler Burton Smith and Sinikka Annala)	Nominated	
2024	Hugo Awards	Best Game or Interactive Work	Nominated	
2025	14th New York Game Awards	NYC GWB Award for Best DLC (Night Springs and The Lake House)	Nominated	
2025	Game Audio Network Guild Awards	Audio of the Year	Nominated	
2025	Game Audio Network Guild Awards	Best Audio Mix	Nominated	
2025	Game Audio Network Guild Awards	Best Cinematic & Cutscene Audio	Nominated	
2025	Game Audio Network Guild Awards	Dialogue of the Year	Nominated	
2025	Game Audio Network Guild Awards	Sound Design of the Year	Nominated	
