= Max Payne =

Video game series

- Genre: Third-person shooter
- Developers: Remedy Entertainment (2001–2003; 2022–present); Rockstar Studios (2012)
- Publishers: Gathering of Developers (2001, PC); Rockstar Games
- Writers: Sam Lake (1–2); Dan Houser (3); Michael Unsworth (3); Rupert Humphries (3)
- Composers: Kärtsy Hatakka (1–2); Kimmo Kajasto (1–2); Perttu Kivilaakso (2); Health (3)
- Platforms: Microsoft Windows; PlayStation 2; PlayStation 3; PlayStation 5; Xbox; Xbox 360; Xbox One; Xbox Series X/S; Mac OS X; Game Boy Advance; Android; iOS
- First release: Max Payne; July 24, 2001
- Latest release: Max Payne 3 May 15, 2012

Max Payne is a neo-noir third-person shooter video game series developed by Remedy Entertainment (Max Payne and Max Payne 2) and Rockstar Studios (Max Payne 3). The series is named after its protagonist, Max Payne, a New York City police detective turned vigilante after his family was murdered by drug addicts. The first two installments were written by Sam Lake, while Max Payne 3 was primarily written by Rockstar Games' Dan Houser.

The first game in the series, Max Payne, was released for Windows in 2001 and for PlayStation 2, Xbox, and Apple Macintosh in 2002; a different version of the game was released for the Game Boy Advance in 2003. A sequel, titled Max Payne 2: The Fall of Max Payne was released for PlayStation 2, Windows, and Xbox in 2003. In 2008, a movie adaptation, loosely based on the original game, entitled Max Payne, was released, starring Mark Wahlberg and Mila Kunis in the roles of Max Payne and Mona Sax, respectively. Max Payne 3 was developed by Rockstar Studios and released for PlayStation 3, Windows, and Xbox 360 in 2012.

In November 2021, Microsoft announced that in celebration of 20 years of Xbox, they would be adding over 70 more games to their backwards compatibility program. Headlining these games was the Max Payne trilogy, making the games available to play on Xbox One and Xbox Series X/S.

The franchise is notable for its use of "bullet time" in action sequences, as well as being positively received by critics. As of 2011, the Max Payne franchise has sold over 7.5 million units. The film rendition received negative reviews but was commercially successful.

In April 2022, Remedy Entertainment announced that remakes of Max Payne and Max Payne 2 are being developed in collaboration with Rockstar Games. The two games will be released as a single title.

== Games ==
Aggregate review scores
Game	Metacritic
Max Payne	(GBA) 78 (PC) 89 (PS2) 80 (Xbox) 89
Max Payne 2: The Fall of Max Payne	(PC) 86 (PS2) 73 (Xbox) 84
Max Payne 3	(PC) 87 (PS3) 87 (X360) 86

=== Max Payne ===
Renegade DEA agent and former NYPD officer Max Payne attempts to hunt down the ones responsible for murdering his wife and child, as well as framing him for the murder of his NYPD partner, Alex Balder. As the story unfolds, he gains a number of "allies", including Vladimir Lem (a suave, old-fashioned Russian mobster) and Mona Sax (a vigilante who is out to avenge the death of her twin sister) and uncovers a major conspiracy involving the trafficking of a narcotic called V, or Valkyr—after the mythological figures in Norse mythology—which is somehow connected to the death of Max's family.

=== Max Payne 2: The Fall of Max Payne ===
Two years after the first game, Max Payne has rejoined the NYPD and has been cleared of the charges for his killing spree thanks to his connection to Senator Alfred Woden, the leader of a secret society called the Inner Circle. During a routine murder investigation, Max finds himself face-to-face with the fugitive Mona Sax, who reluctantly joins him in his investigation. As the two work together to uncover the truth, they begin to develop feelings for each other, and come across another major conspiracy, which this time involves Vladimir Lem, the Italian Mob, and the Inner Circle.

=== Max Payne 3 ===
Nine years after the second game, Max Payne has left New York and is working on a private security detail in São Paulo, Brazil. When the wife of his employer is kidnapped by a local street gang, Max and his old friend Raul Passos join forces in an attempt to rescue her, igniting a war that will lead them to confront a larger conspiracy.

=== Remakes ===
Remedy Entertainment, with funding from Rockstar (who holds the rights to the series), announced plans to remake Max Payne and Max Payne 2 for PC, PlayStation 5, and Xbox Series X/S in April 2022. At the time of the announcement, the remakes were at an early development state, and no planned release date was announced. It was confirmed that the two games will be released as a single title.

== Film adaptation ==
Early in 2003, it was confirmed that 20th Century Fox had bought the rights to adapt the game to film. The Max Payne movie went into production in 2008 and was directed by John Moore. The movie was produced by Collision Entertainment and Firm Films in Toronto, Ontario, Canada. Mark Wahlberg and Mila Kunis play the roles of Max Payne and Mona Sax respectively. Beau Bridges, Chris O'Donnell, Nelly Furtado and Ludacris have roles as B.B. Hensley, Jason Colvin, Christa Balder and Jim Bravura respectively. On July 10, 2008, a teaser trailer was released, featuring an instrumental version of the Marilyn Manson song, "If I Was Your Vampire". The film was released to theaters in the U.S. on October 17, 2008, with a PG-13 rating. While it was ranked first on its opening weekend, grossing US$18 million at the box office, the film received mainly negative reviews, having a 16% rating at Rotten Tomatoes, based on 129 reviews. In June 2022, 20th Century Studios announced that a Max Payne reboot movie is in development.

== Characters ==
Characters and their actors across Max Payne media
Character	Games			Film
Character	Max Payne (2001)	Max Payne 2: The Fall of Max Payne (2003)	Max Payne 3 (2012)	Max Payne (2008)
Max Payne	James McCaffrey	James McCaffrey	James McCaffrey	Mark Wahlberg
Mona Sax	Julia Murney	Wendy Hoopes	Wendy Hoopes	Mila Kunis
Vladimir Lem	Dominic Hawksley	Jonathan Davis	Jonathan Davis	—N/a
Senator Alfred Woden	John Randolph Jones	John Braden	John Randolph Jones	—N/a
Vinnie Gognitti	Joe Dallo	Fred Berman	Fred Berman	—N/a
Lt. Jim Bravura	Peter Appel	Vince Viverito	—N/a	Ludacris
Nicole Horne	Jane Gennaro	Jane Gennaro	Jane Gennaro	Kate Burton
Michelle Payne	Haviland Morris	Unvoiced	—N/a	Marianthi Evans
Alex Balder	Chris Philips	—N/a	—N/a	Donal Logue
B.B. Hensley	Adam Grupper	—N/a	—N/a	Beau Bridges
Don Angelo Punchinello	Joe Ragno	—N/a	Joe Ragno	—N/a
Jack Lupino	Jeff Gurner	—N/a	Jeff Gurner	Amaury Nolasco
Joey & Virgilio Finito	Tye Reign	—N/a	—N/a	—N/a
Rico Muerte	Joe Maruzzo	—N/a	—N/a	—N/a
Candy Dawn	Joanie Ellen	—N/a	—N/a	—N/a
Frankie "The Bat" Niagara	Bruce Kronenberg	—N/a	—N/a	—N/a
Boris Dime	Peter Appel	—N/a	—N/a	—N/a
Vince Mugnaio	Unvoiced	—N/a	—N/a	—N/a
Pilate "Big Brother" Providence	Unvoiced	—N/a	—N/a	—N/a
Joe "Deadpan" Salem	Unvoiced	—N/a	—N/a	—N/a
Lisa Punchinello / Natasha Sax	Unvoiced	—N/a	—N/a	Olga Kurylenko
Det. Valerie Winterson	—N/a	Jennifer Server	Jennifer Server	—N/a
Kaufman	—N/a	Gregory Sims	—N/a	—N/a
Mike "The Cowboy"	—N/a	Gary Yudman	—N/a	—N/a
Annie Finn	—N/a	Kimberly Howard	—N/a	—N/a
Senator Sebastian Gates	—N/a	Unvoiced	—N/a	—N/a
Corcoran	—N/a	Unvoiced	—N/a	—N/a
Raul Passos	—N/a	—N/a	Julian Dean	—N/a
Rodrigo Branco	—N/a	—N/a	Frank Rodriguez	—N/a
Victor Branco	—N/a	—N/a	Robert Montano	—N/a
Marcelo Branco	—N/a	—N/a	Dillon Porter	—N/a
Fabiana Branco	—N/a	—N/a	Benedita Aires Pereira	—N/a
Giovanna Taveres	—N/a	—N/a	Shirley Rumierk	—N/a
Wilson Da Silva	—N/a	—N/a	Stephen Girasuolo	—N/a
Serrano	—N/a	—N/a	Babs Olusanmokun	—N/a
Armando Becker	—N/a	—N/a	Bira Castro	—N/a
Álvaro Neves	—N/a	—N/a	Gil Cardoso	—N/a
Bachmeyer	—N/a	—N/a	Gilberto Romagnolo	—N/a
Milo Rego	—N/a	—N/a	Daniel Bittencourt	—N/a
Anthony DeMarco	—N/a	—N/a	Ray Iannicelli	—N/a
Tony DeMarco	—N/a	—N/a	Charlie Semine	—N/a
Arthur Fischer	—N/a	—N/a	Marconi de Morais	—N/a
Anders Detling	—N/a	—N/a	Wayne Duvall	—N/a
Jason Colvin	—N/a	—N/a	—N/a	Chris O'Donnell
Christa Balder	—N/a	—N/a	—N/a	Nelly Furtado
Owen Green	—N/a	—N/a	—N/a	Joel Gordon
Lincoln DeNeuf	—N/a	—N/a	—N/a	Jamie Hector
Tattoo Artist	—N/a	—N/a	—N/a	Stephen R. Hart
