= List of vigilantes in popular culture =

This is a list of vigilantes featured in popular culture and entertainment media. For commentary, see the main vigilante article.

== Film ==
=== 1920–1980 ===
- The Mark of Zorro (1920)
- Robin Hood (1922)
- Don Q, Son of Zorro (1925)
- In Old Arizona (1928)
- The Beast of the City (1932)
- The Scarlet Pimpernel (1934)
- Black Legion (1937)
- The Adventures of Robin Hood (1938)
- The Oklahoma Kid (1939)
- The Mark of Zorro (1940)
- The Son of Monte Cristo (1940)
- The Oxbow Incident (1943)
- Batman (1943)
- Cornered (1945)
- The Bandit of Sherwood Forest (1946)
- House of Strangers (1949)
- Obsession (1949)
- The Elusive Pimpernel (1950)
- Rogues of Sherwood Forest (1950)
- The Story of Robin Hood and His Merrie Men (1952)
- The Big Heat (1953)
- Broken Lance (1954)
- Kiss Me Deadly (1955)
- The Big Show (1961)
- Cape Fear (1962)
- The Sons of Katie Elder (1965)
- Dirty Harry series (1971, 1973, 1976, 1983, 1988)
- Shaft (1971) and (2000)
- Billy Jack (1971)
- Coffy (1973)
- High Plains Drifter (1973)
- Robin Hood (1973)
- The Seven-Ups (1973)
- Walking Tall franchise (1973, 1975, 1977; 2004)
- Death Wish series (1974, 1982, 1985, 1987, 1994, 2017)
- Street Law (1974)
- T.N.T. Jackson (1974)
- Truck Turner (1974)
- The Mark of Zorro (1974)
- Deadly Hero (1976)
- Taxi Driver (1976)
- Trackdown (1976)
- Vigilante Force (1976)
- Lipstick (1976)
- I Spit on Your Grave (1978)
- Superman (1978)
- Mad Max (1979)

=== 1980–2004 ===
- The Exterminator (1980) and its sequel Exterminator 2 (1984)
- Zorro, The Gay Blade (1981)
- Fighting Back (1982)
- The Star Chamber (1983)
- Vigilante (1983)
- Savage Streets (1984)
- Pale Rider (1985)
- Lethal Weapon series (1987, 1989, 1992, 1998)
- Mr. India (1987)
- Above the Law (1988)
- Shahenshah (1988)
- Batman franchise (1989, 1992, 1995, 1997, 2005, 2008, 2012, 2016, 2022)
- Spider-Man franchise (2002, 2004, 2007, 2012, 2014, 2017, 2019, 2021)
- The Punisher franchise (1989, 2004, 2008)
- Teenage Mutant Ninja Turtles franchise (1990, 1991, 1993, 2007, 2014, 2016)
- Darkman (1990)
- Hard to Kill (1990)
- Robin Hood (1991)
- One Good Cop (1991)
- Robin Hood: Prince of Thieves (1991)
- Cape Fear (1991)
- Unforgiven (1992)
- Batman: Mask of the Phantasm (1993)
- Falling Down (1993)
- The Crow (1994)
- The Shadow (1994)
- Jimmy Hollywood (1994)
- Leon: The Professional (1994)
- Darkman II: The Return of Durant (1995)
- Desperado (1995)
- Darkman III: Die Darkman Die (1996)
- Eye for an Eye (1996)
- The Crow: City of Angels (1996)
- A Time to Kill (1996)
- Blade franchise (1998, 2002, 2004)
- The Mask of Zorro (1998) and its sequel The Legend of Zorro (2005)
- The Boondock Saints (1999) and its sequel The Boondock Saints II: All Saints Day (2009)
- The Limey (1999)
- Chopper (2000)
- The Crow: Salvation (2000)
- Unbreakable (2000)
- Skins (2002)
- Daredevil (2003)
- A Man Apart (2003)
- 4 the People (2004)
- Catwoman (2004)
- Dead Man's Shoes (2004)
- The Incredibles (2004)
- Man on Fire (2004)
- Saw series (2004, 2005, 2006, 2007, 2008, 2009, 2010, 2017)
- Suspect Zero (2004)
- Van Helsing (2004)

=== 2005–present ===
- Anniyan (2005)
- The Crow: Wicked Prayer (2005)
- The Devil's Rejects (2005)
- Four Brothers (2005)
- Hard Candy (2005)
- Sin City (2005)
- V for Vendetta (2006)
- The Brave One (2007)
- Death Sentence (2007)
- Hot Fuzz (2007)
- Ghost Rider (2007)
- Outlaw (2007)
- Shooter (2007)
- Shoot 'Em Up (2007)
- Straightheads (2007)
- Gardener of Eden (2007)
- Taken (2008)
- Hancock (2008)
- Beer for My Horses (2008)
- Gran Torino (2008)
- The Spirit (2008)
- Watchmen (2009)
- Superman/Batman: Public Enemies (2009)
- Harry Brown (2009)
- Law Abiding Citizen (2009)
- Batman: Under the Red Hood (2010)
- Defendor (2010)
- Edge of Darkness (2010)
- Faster (2010)
- Kick-Ass (2010) and its sequel Kick-Ass 2 (2013)
- Machete (2010) and its sequel Machete Kills (2013)
- Robin Hood (2010)
- Super (2010)
- Hobo with a Shotgun (2011)
- Gone (2012)
- Bad Ass (2012)
- The Amazing Spider-Man (2012)
- Dredd (2012)
- Jack Reacher (2012)
- The Lone Ranger (2013)
- Prisoners (2013)
- Odd Thomas (2013)
- Man of Steel (2013)
- The Equalizer (2014)
- John Wick (2014)
- Kite (2014)
- Mr X (2015)
- Suicide Squad (2016)
- The Lego Batman Movie (2017)
- The Dark Tower (2017)
- Robin Hood (2018)
- Bhavesh Joshi Superhero (2018)
- Birds of Prey (2020)
- "The Beekeeper" (2024)

== Radio ==
- The Lone Ranger

== Television ==
- Zorro (1957–59)
- The Green Hornet (1966–7)
- CHiPs (1977–83) season 4, episode 19, "Vigilante" (15 March 1981)
- Knight Rider (1982–86)
- The A-Team (1983–7)
- The Equalizer (1985–9)
- MacGyver (1985–92)
- Bubblegum Crisis (1987)
- Tales from the Crypt (1989–96) episode "The Man Who Was Death"
- The Simpsons episode "Homer the Vigilante" (1994)
- Bubblegum Crash (1991)
- Dark Justice (1991–93)
- Darkwing Duck (1991–92)
- Batman: The Animated Series (1992–95)
- Spider-Man: The Animated Series (1994–98)
- SWAT Kats (1993–95)
- Code Geass
- You're Under Arrest! (1996–2008), Strike Man often distributes divine punishment upon wrong doers who illegally park their cars or smoke in smoking-free zones
- Bubblegum Crisis 2040 (1997–98)
- Teenage Mutant Ninja Turtles (1987–96)
- The Adventures of Sam & Max: Freelance Police (1997–98)
- Vengeance Unlimited (1998–99)
- Mezzo Forte (1998)
- Batman Beyond (1999–2001)
- Playboy's Dark Justice (2000–01)
- Queen of Swords (2000–01)
- Dark Angel (2000–02)
- Jackie Chan Adventures (2000–05)
- Mezzo DSA (2001)
- Murder in Mind episode "Vigilante" (2001)
- Birds of Prey (2002–03)
- Death Note (2003–06)
- The 4400 (2004–present), season 1, episode 2, an improved Carl Morrissey cleans the Bradley Park in order to bring it back to its old state
- The Batman (2004–08)
- Jericho (2006–08)
- Dexter (2006–13)
- Darker Than Black (2007–09)
- Knight Rider (2008)
- Leverage (2008–12)
- Casualty series 23 episode "Farmead Menace" (2008)
- Person of Interest (2011–present)
- Human Target (2011–12)
- Homeland (2011–present)
- Arrow (2012–present)
- The Flash (2014–2015)
- Marvel's Daredevil (2015–present)
- Hand of God (2014–2017)
- Marvel's The Punisher (2017–present)
- Superman: The Animated Series (1996-2000)
- Supergirl (2015-2021)
- The Boys (2019-present)
- Invincible (2021–present)
- Peacemaker (2022-2025)

== Literature ==
- The Scarlet Pimpernel (1903) by Emma Orczy and Montague Barstow
- Crossfire (1998) by Miyuki Miyabe
- The Virginian by Owen Wister (1902), the first American western novel based on the theme of "frontier justice"
- Jimmie Dale, alias the Gray Seal (1914) by Frank L. Packard the first masked urban crime-fighter in American popular culture.
- Zorro (1919) by Johnston McCulley
- Without Remorse (1993) by Tom Clancy, explicitly about an ex-US Navy SEAL wiping out a gang of drug dealers
- Darkly Dreaming Dexter (2004), Dearly Devoted Dexter (2005), and Dexter in the Dark (2007) by Jeff Lindsay, with adapted TV series Dexter (2006), all about fictional character Dexter Morgan who by day is a blood splatter expert for the Miami-Dade Police Department and by night hunts down and kills those who he feels "deserve to die"
- The Chocolate War (1973) by Robert Cormier, The Vigils, a semi-private group (students and teachers know of them but do not speak of them) who run the school, giving students "assignments" that bend or break school rules and regulations
- The Executioner (1963–) by Don Pendleton, a book series about an ex-US Army Master Sergeant sniper named Mack Bolan and his "war" against the Mafia
- Khabardar Shahri (rough Hindi translation of "vigilante"), one of the most famous vimal series of novels by Surender Mohan Pathak in which the hero, a serious offender on brink of reform takes up arms once again to punish five rapists one of whom is nephew of the kingpin of the local crime syndicate which results in a new gang war and the unfortunate Vimal find himself back in world of violence
- Dirty Weekend (1991) by Helen Zahavi is about a young woman who kills seven predatory males over three nights. It was later made into a movie (1993) by film director Michael Winner.

== Comics ==
- Americop
- Blade
- Batman
- Batgirl
- Batwoman
- Black Canary
- Black Cat
- Casey Jones
- The Crush
- Cloak and Dagger
- Crimson Avenger
- Daredevil
- Deadpool
- Death Note
- Doc Savage
- Elektra
- Foolkiller
- Ghost Rider
- Green Arrow
- Hellboy
- Hit-Girl
- Huntress
- Iron Fist
- Jessica Jones
- Kick-Ass
- Luke Cage
- Malcolm Reynolds
- Miles Morales
- Moon Knight
- Nightwing
- Peacemaker
- The Phantom
- Punisher
- Question
- Red Hood
- Robin
- Rorschach
- Sam & Max
- The Shadow
- Solitaire
- Spawn
- Speedy
- Spider-Man
- Teenage Mutant Ninja Turtles
- Venom
- V
- Vigilante
- Wallestein the Monster
- Wild Dog
- X

== Pulp Fiction ==
- The Shadow
- The Green Hornet
- Zorro

== Video games ==
- Renegade (1986)
- Double Dragon (1987)
- Vigilante (1988)
- River City Ransom (1989)
- Final Fight (1989)
- Streets of Rage (1991)
- Final Fight 2 (1993)
- Final Fight 3 (1995)
- Interstate '76 (1997)
- Infamous series (2009–2014)
- Deus Ex (2000)
- Vigilante 8 (2000)
- Vigilante 8: 2nd Offense (2001)
- Max Payne (2001)
- Jak II (2003)
- Max Payne 2: The Fall of Max Payne (2003)
- Red Dead Revolver (2004)
- Max Payne 3 (2012)
- Manhunt (2003)
- The Punisher (2005)
- Condemned: Criminal Origins (2005)
- Total Overdose (2005)
- Manhunt 2 (2007)
- Tales of Vesperia (2008)
- Persona 4 (2008)
- Watchmen: The End Is Nigh (2009)
- Batman: Arkham series (2009–2015)
- Watch Dogs (2014)
- Marvel Ultimate Alliance 2 (2009)
- Red Dead Redemption (2010)
- Persona 5 (2016)
- Red Dead Redemption II (2018)
- Ratchet & Clank: Rift Apart (2021)
- Final Fantasy XVI (2023)
- Grand Theft Auto series, the player has the opportunity to steal a police vehicle and play as a vigilante
- Sly Cooper series (2002–2013)
