= Mona Sax =

Fictional character in the Max Payne franchise

- Max Payne character
- Mona Sax as depicted in Max Payne 2 (2003)
- First game: Max Payne (2001)
- Created by: Sam Lake
- Voiced by: Julia Murney (Max Payne); Wendy Hoopes (Max Payne 2 and Max Payne 3)
- Motion capture: Carol Kiriakos (Max Payne); Kathy Tong (Max Payne 2)
- Portrayed by: Mila Kunis

Mona Sax is a character in the neo-noir media franchise Max Payne, where she represents the femme fatale archetype. Mona is a mysterious contract killer in a dangerous relationship with the series' titular protagonist, the policeman-turned-vigilante Max Payne. The character was portrayed by Carol Kiriakos and Kathy Tong, and voiced by Julia Murney and Wendy Hoopes in the video games, and was played by Mila Kunis in the film adaptation.

Mona appears in the first two games in the series, Max Payne and Max Payne 2: The Fall of Max Payne. She is the second player character in Max Payne 2 after Max, and her tragic love story with Max is the center of the game's storyline. Mona also appears as a major character in the 2008 film Max Payne and makes a cameo appearance in the multiplayer mode of Max Payne 3. The games' version of the character was perceived highly positively by gaming community and mass media, but her portrayal in the movie received largely negative reviews.

== Appearances ==
=== In video games ===
Mona Sax is a mysterious professional assassin, living in a derelict theme park on Coney Island that she set up as her base. She is introduced in the first Max Payne game as the "evil twin" of her younger sister Lisa, the abused wife of the Mafia boss Angelo Punchinello. Mona is captured by Punchinello's assassins before she could kill him, but manages to escape. It is revealed that she was employed by Nicole Horne, the renegade member of the secret society calling themselves the Inner Circle who has left the organization and manages Aesir Industries, a mysterious corporation that is behind the drug Valkyr. Horne ordered Mona to murder Punchinello since he wanted to act independent and out of her orders, a job Mona took because it was personal to her. By the end of the first game, Mona disappears in the Aesir headquarters elevator after being shot in the head by mercenaries for refusing an order to kill Max.

In Max Payne 2: The Fall of Max Payne, more focus is given to Max and Mona's relationship, and she becomes one of the game's two protagonists. Mona reappears as a suspect in the murder of the U.S. Senator Sebastian Gate. The case is assigned to Max Payne's new partner, detective Valerie Winterson, but despite their past, Max does not inform the authorities that he knows Mona nor does he inform them of her visit to his apartment. During the course of the game, it is revealed that Mona is indeed the killer of Senator Gate. To save her, Max is forced to shoot the corrupt Winterson before she can execute Mona. Mona and Max work together to prevent shadowy hitmen known as Cleaners from eliminating both of them. Eventually, it is revealed that Mona's employer was Alfred Woden, a U.S. senator and a member of the Inner Circle's faction warring with the faction of the Russian mob boss Vladimir Lem. In the end, she is shot in the back by Lem, whom Max kills. She dies in Max's arms as he kisses her, but lives on the game's hardest difficulty level, "Dead on Arrival".

Mona does not appear in the gameplay of the first Max Payne game, but appears only in its cutscenes. She became playable in four chapters of the first sequel, Max Payne 2 ("Routing Her Synapses", "Out of the Window", "The Genius of the Hole" and "A Losing Game"). In it, Mona's moves are more acrobatic than Max's, and her sections involve several sniping sequences where Mona is equipped with a Dragunov sniper rifle to provide cover fire for Max. Her signature weapon is a Desert Eagle. Mona was also included as a playable multiplayer character in the Classic Multiplayer Character Pack of Max Payne 3 Special Edition.

=== Other appearances ===
Mila Kunis as Mona in the film

Mona was portrayed by Mila Kunis in the 2008 film Max Payne, whose role was described as "an assassin who teams up with the title character to avenge her sister's death." In the film, she is a Russian mobster and Max is the main suspect in the death of her sister Natasha (an original character similar to the game's Lisa and portrayed by Olga Kurylenko). Eventually, Max and Mona join forces to uncover the vast conspiracy behind the Valkyr drug.

She also appears in the flashback sequences in the Marvel digital comic book Max Payne 3: After the Fall. Her clothes for the Xbox Live Avatar were released by Rockstar Games on the Xbox LIVE Marketplace.

== Portrayal ==
According to the first two games' writer Sam Lake, he "did want to switch to Mona [...] but it was problematic. In the end, Max frames those sequences with his narration, saying that he doesn’t know exactly what happened, or what Mona did, but it must have been something like this. In other words, when you are playing Mona, you are actually experiencing Max’s guess of the events". Regarding Mona's possible survival at the end of Max Payne 2, Rockstar's Dan Houser stated that Max Payne 3 would "not continue that aspect of the story. We toyed with figuring out some way, or doing something clever, and then [decided] 'No, no, just move on from that bit of the story.' It really didn't work because there was no way of knowing the choices someone made."

As a self-described method actress, Kunis "took her job seriously" and "insisted on practicing a lot", but disliked Mona's outfit in the film, which was different from what the character wore in the games: "The clothes sucked. Oh my God, it was awful. Mark was like bundled up in jackets and wet suits and coats and turtlenecks and I was in a leather bustier and black pants and 5-inch heels."

== Reception ==
Writing in the book Philosophy Through Video Games, Jon Cogburn and Mark Silcox praised the video game version of Mona Sax for being one of the few "relatively complex, non-stereotypical female game characters". However, the authors also considered Mona to have adhered to some gender stereotypes, despite genuine attempts to make her a strong female character. While presenting as brave and competent, Mona also refers to herself as a "damsel in distress", and her inability to kill Max, due to having developed "feelings" for him, was described as the games' designers pandering to "locker-room gender ideology".

Mona has been featured in multiple lists that regard her as one of the best or more important female characters in video games. David Sanchez of GameZone proposed that Mona appear in her own spin-off game, regarding her as one of the most attractive "femme fatales" in gaming and feeling that she would "deliver an unforgettable experience." Much of the positive reception came from the character's perceived sex appeal. Reviewing Max Payne 2, Nick Catucci of The Village Voice criticized both Max and Mona's characters in passing, regarding the game's script to be of poor quality.

Mona Sax film actress Mila Kunis received generally negative reception from critics at TIME and GameZone, the latter whom felt the video game portrayal was superior. Complex felt she was miscast as Mona Sax due to her being "petite and angelic-faced." However, Kunis was nominated in the category "Choice Movie Actress: Action Adventure" at the Teen Choice Awards 2009 for her portrayal.
