= Max Payne (character) =

Video game character

- Max Payne character
- Max Payne in a promotional image for Max Payne 3 (2012)
- First game: Max Payne (2001)
- Created by: Sam Lake
- Portrayed by: Various: Sam Lake (Max Payne) Timothy Gibbs (Max Payne 2) James McCaffrey (Max Payne 3) Mark Wahlberg (film)
- Voiced by: James McCaffrey (2001–2012)
- Motion capture: James McCaffrey (2012)

In-universe information
- Origin: New York City, United States
- Nationality: American

Max Payne is a fictional character who is the titular protagonist of the neo-noir video game series of the same name. Created by and initially modeled after the likeness of Sam Lake, Max was introduced in an eponymous 2001 video game developed by Remedy Entertainment. Max was voiced by actor James McCaffrey in all his appearances, and was modeled after Lake, Timothy Gibbs and McCaffrey in the series' various installments; Mark Wahlberg portrayed Max in the 2008 film adaptation of the series. Inspired by the antiheroes of hardboiled fiction, Max is a weary and cynical ex-NYPD officer who becomes a vigilante and uncovers various criminal conspiracies.

In the original Max Payne, Max is an NYPD police detective and an undercover special agent for the DEA. He becomes a vigilante following the murder of his family and, later, the murder of his police partner, for which he was framed. In the second game, Max Payne 2: The Fall of Max Payne, he returns to the department as a detective and must solve a conspiracy filled with death and betrayal, which has a deep effect on his personal life. At the start of Max Payne 3, which was developed by Rockstar Games, Max finds himself employed as a bodyguard for Rodrigo Branco, a wealthy businessman in São Paulo, Brazil, but is soon drawn into another conspiracy. The character has been well-received by critics.

== Character development ==
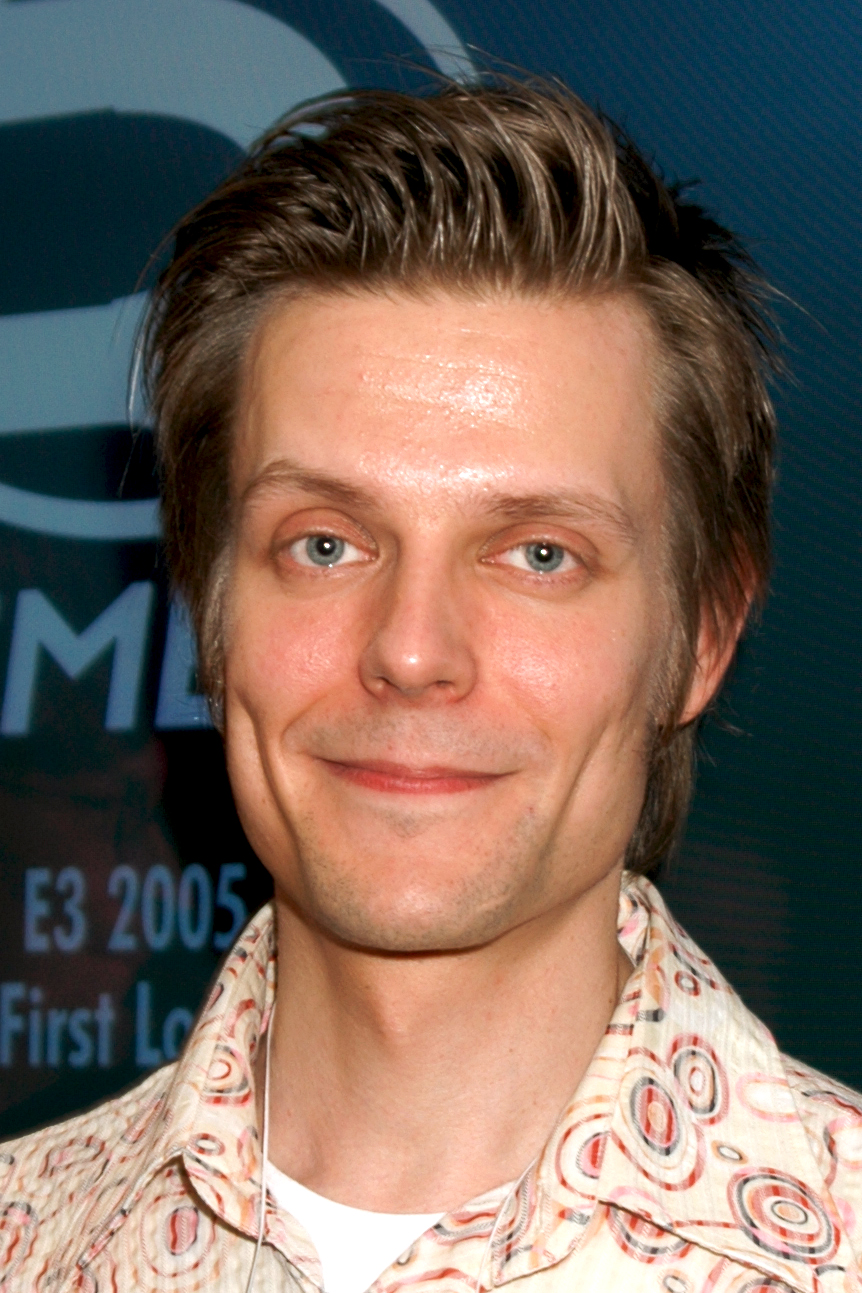
Sam Lake created the character; his face was used in the original Max Payne.

In the creation of Max Payne, the publisher 3D Realms "wanted to develop another strong character that would be the foundation for a new gaming franchise, much like we [3D Realms] had done with Duke Nukem." The titular character of Max Payne was originally named Max Heat, and 3D Realms spent over $20,000 worldwide trademarking this name before someone at the company suggested the last name Payne, which was immediately adopted. He was modeled after Sam Lake (Sami Järvi), who wrote the game's story and script for the Finnish company Remedy Entertainment. Lake also dressed up and played this role for the graphic novel-style cutscenes. For Max Payne 2: The Fall of Max Payne, however, Lake declined the role. Due to having a much larger budget this time, the developers were able to hire professional actors, choosing Timothy Gibbs to be the new model for Max.

In both games, Max's voice actor was James McCaffrey. McCaffrey recalled: "Originally, I’d worked on a show called Swift Justice, and there were some similarities between the two characters in terms of them both having experienced some family tragedy and were familiar with the concept of vengeance, but there weren't any specific characters that Max is based on." In an early announcement from Rockstar Games (the franchise's new developer and publisher), Max's voice actor was to be recast with an older actor. In the end, however, McCaffrey did return to the role of Max in Max Payne 3, for which he also provided the motion capture material. McCaffrey said that performing motion capture helped match the dialogue to the scenes and compared it to "having to act in Avatar." Payne's look changed significantly for the third game, featuring an older, bald and bearded Max; this move received overwhelmingly negative reactions. In response, Rockstar Games made changes to the game, as Max's appearance shifts over the course of the game, including his 'classic' appearance during flashbacks of his time in New Jersey. According to Rockstar's Sam Houser, "This is Max as we've never seen him before, a few years older, more world-weary and cynical than ever." McCaffrey compared Max in the third game to Charles Bronson's character Paul Kersey in the film Death Wish.

=== Attributes ===
Max Payne has been put into a fatalist situation against his will, in the style of a classic element of many noir films, the fall guy. Max is an antihero, as he himself states: "I was not one of them, I was no hero." The character is noted for his complex use of both metaphors and wordplay to describe the world around him within his inner monologues, which often contradict his external responses to characters he speaks with. He is an extreme introvert and his life is largely illustrated through dramatic and often morbidly cynical soliloquies describing his feelings about his actions and situation. It is also hinted through the games that Max has a questionable grip on reality.

At the beginning of the first game, Max is seen differently as a smiling, happily married extrovert with a bright personality. However, after his family is murdered, Max loses his meaning of life and blindly works toward his only remaining purpose: vengeance. However, he has not nullified his feelings, as he is taken with the femme fatale contract killer Mona Sax when they first meet, and befriends the Russian mobster Vladimir Lem. All the while, Max shows signs of survivor's guilt and self-destructive behaviour.

Rockstar vice-president Dan Houser described Max Payne in the third game as "a drunk, somewhat morose, widowed ex-cop, trying to find some kind of peace with himself. [...] A man who has spent his life killing, even in the service of his idea of what is right or wrong, is going to be extremely damaged. [...] He wants to be a thinker but he's much better as a doer. When he thinks, he gets wrapped up in himself or makes mistakes. When he acts, he is brilliant, almost super human. That is his character, and the dichotomy between the two is the reality of his life and at the heart of the game. He cannot seem to move forward emotionally, but physically, he is relentless." Max is shown to be quite aware of his shortcomings and flaws, stating: "I'm not slipping. I'm slipped. I'm a bad joke." Max Payne 3 has him display not only extreme violence but also more restraint than in the previous games.

== Appearances ==
=== In video games ===
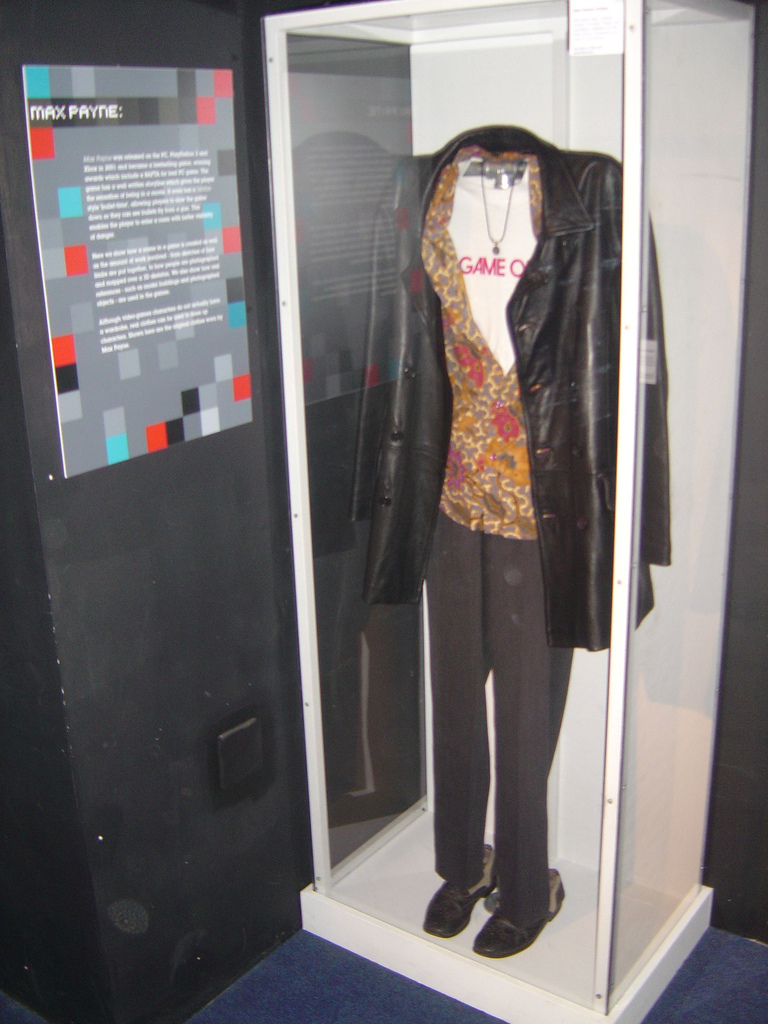
Max's standard outfit from the first game on display at Game On exhibition in the Science Museum

In the original game, set between 1998 and 2001, Max Payne (voiced by James McCaffrey) is a former New York City Police Department (NYPD) homicide detective whose wife Michelle and six-month-old daughter Rose were brutally murdered in a home invasion connected with the investigation of a new street drug known as Valkyr. Enraged, Max joined the Drug Enforcement Administration (DEA) as a secret agent and went undercover in the Mafia. Eventually, framed for the murder of his NYPD and DEA partner Alex Balder, and with his identity exposed, Max becomes a fugitive and vigilante wanted by the Mafia and the police alike while waging his personal war on the crime. Eventually, he discovers a powerful conspiracy behind all these events, and has several interactions with Mona Sax, an assassin. Max makes a deal with the leader of a secret society called the Inner Circle to clear his name in exchange for killing the organisation's former member Nicole Horne; Horne is responsible for the manufacture of Valkyr and also the death of Max's family. After Max kills Horne, he surrenders and is taken into police custody.

Max Payne 2, primarily set in 2003, shows Max returning to the NYPD, having had his named cleared by the leader of the Inner Circle. Max begins investigating a series of murders by a shadowy group of contract killers called the Cleaners, who are trying to kill all members of the Inner Circle. Soon, Max reunites with Mona Sax and solves the mysteries of the Inner Circle, however, the investigation leads to Mona's death.

Max Payne 3, primarily set in 2012, shows Max living in New Jersey, now addicted to alcohol and painkillers, having retired from the police. After a violent mob confrontation, he is forced to flee for the unfamiliar streets of São Paulo, Brazil. Max gets a job working in a security detail for Rodrigo Branco, a wealthy businessman along with Raul Passos who went through police training with Max. After Rodrigo's wife is kidnapped, Max and Raul discover and then destroy a human organ harvesting ring involving local street gangs, right-wing vigilante militas and a corrupt Brazilian police tactical unit.

=== In film ===
In the film adaptation, loosely based on the plot of the first game, Max Payne (played by Mark Wahlberg) is a NYPD cop seeking revenge against his family's killers. When Mark Wahlberg first read Beau Thorne's script he thought it was "awesome" but became wary after finding out it was based on a video game. Describing his role, Wahlberg said: "It's probably one of the edgier roles I've played but also the most layered. Here's a very happy guy who worked a dismal job, had a beautiful family. But the beauty in his life was taken away. He just goes on a rampage. It's all driven by emotion." 3D Realms' Scott Miller, however, said Max Payne was poorly portrayed in the film, falling short of the game's standards.

=== Other appearances ===
A three-issue Max Payne 3 tie-in digital comic, created and released in partnership between Rockstar Games and Marvel Comics explores Max's early years and the events prior to the third game in the series. Max was born to Helen and Jack Payne. Max's father was a PTSD-suffering Vietnam veteran who cheated on and sometimes beat his wife. An important influence on the boy was his maternal grandfather; a college professor who would tell him stories of ancient mythology. Helen died in 1976, possibly due to her alcoholism; Jack's death followed three years later. As a young man, Max graduated from the New York City Police Academy as the top trainee in his class. Several years later, he met his future wife Michelle while saving her from two robbers. They married six months later and their daughter, Rose, was born on February 4, 1998.

In 2012, several sets of Max Payne's Xbox Live Avatar clothes from the original game were released by Rockstar on the Xbox Live Marketplace. Max Payne 3 Special Edition was bundled with a 10" tall collectible Max Payne statue made by TriForce. According to an Easter egg in Remedy Entertainment's Alan Wake, Max died in 2016, thirteen years after the events of Max Payne 2. However, this is not canonical, as the rights to the series have moved to Rockstar Games. In Rockstar's 2013 video game Grand Theft Auto V, players can customize one of the protagonists, Michael De Santa, to look like Max in Max Payne 3.

== Reception ==
Max Payne has been positively received in video game journalism. Following the release of the first game in 2001, he was named the year's best game character by Eurogamer. While considering the game itself to be "relatively mindless", PC Zone considered Max's character to be the highlight, commenting: "He might be a film noir cliché, but Max Payne is a relatively unique specimen in games, with a superb script and suitably smooth voice acting to match." Max has also been polled by the public in lists of the top video-game characters of all time, with Gulf News attributing his popularity with fans to "his no-nonsense, take-no-prisoners attitude." In 2012, IGN described him as gaming's "most notorious antihero", and in an article covering the character's history, The Escapist opined that even the character's creators underestimated the ongoing appeal of Max, calling him a "uniquely American mix of modern action and classic noir" whose "constant struggle feels timeless." Max is included in many video game journalism articles ranking characters by various traits, ranging from manliness to lucklessness.

Max's dynamic with Mona Sax has also been well received. Tom Macnamara from IGN praised the "star-crossed love story" between Max and Mona as a great addition to Max Payne 2. Also noting the atypical relationship between a police officer and an assassin, in 2011 GamesRadar considered the couple to have one of the most "disastrous game romances". The sex scene between the couple in Max Payne 2 was described by GamePro as "one of the most fitting ever seen in a video game," considering it to lack the gratuitousness that most sex scenes in video games exhibit.

The character's initial design changes during the long development cycle of Max Payne 3 brought severe criticism from the fan community as well as the media; UGO commented that "his suave, noir look got booted by trailer trash sensibilities" and blamed Obadiah Stane, Bam Bam Bigelow, John McClane and Kerry King for being "most responsible for Max's new style." Keith Stuart of The Guardian opined that, with the third game, Rockstar succeeded in turning "its ex-cop anti-hero into a credible character," even as there is a "slight disconnect between the shambling Max of the cinematic sequences and the athletic psychopath we control in the interactive sections."

== See also ==
- List of fictional police detectives
- List of vigilantes in popular culture
