= Jane Gennaro =

American actress

- Born: 1953 (age 72–73); The Bronx, New York City, U.S.
- Occupations: Illustrator; writer; playwright; voice actress; artist
- Years active: 1975–present

Jane Gennaro (born 1953 in The Bronx, New York City) is an American artist, illustrator, playwright, writer and voice actress based in New York City.

== Career ==
=== Illustrator ===
Gennaro's illustrations and cover art were first published in songbooks by Chappell Music in 1975.

Gennaro was hired by MAD magazine editor Jerry DeFuccio to caricature him on personal stationery designs between 1976 and 1978. Gennaro illustrated the MAD ad for Al Jaffee’s “Clods Letters to Mad” and sang on the Mad Magazine novelty record “Makin’ Out”.

From 1976 to 1977 Gennaro worked for Barbara Jo Slate, Inc. drawing Slate's feminist cartoon character, Ms. Liz, which appeared on millions of greeting cards.

In 2012, an exhibition of the illustrated journals Gennaro has been keeping since 1988 was shown in Journeys: Jane Gennaro and Linda Mussman at Time & Space Ltd., Hudson, NY.

=== Comedy writer and performer ===
Between 1977 and 1984 Gennaro performed at The Comic Strip, The Improvisation and Catch a Rising Star in New York City in an act that included singing impressions of MTV rock stars Tina Turner, Yoko Ono, Prince, David Bowie, Annie Lennox and Madonna. Billed as "Mud, Sweat & Jears," Gennaro voiced Cyndi Lauper on the novelty record, "Every Dawg Has Its Day" (Atlantic), a dance tune parody of the pro-wrestling craze. In 1979, George Shea in Attenzione magazine suggested that Gennaro probably is the first Italian stand-up comedian.

Between 1982 and 1983 Gennaro performed with her real-life sisters, as "Those Gennaro Sisters", appearing regularly at Carolines in New York City and other east coast comedy clubs. The act was described as “a fast-paced mixture of music, comedy and satire."

In 2013 Gennaro was among the women authors of “No Kidding, Women Writers on Bypassing Parenthood” edited by Henriette Mantel.

=== Playwright ===
In 1988, Gennaro's solo play "The Boob Story" opened at The American Place Theatre in New York, directed by Wynn Handman. The show was described as "a cautionary serio-comic monologue about breast fetishism in America, and the perils of getting too much of what one wants." Stephen Holden of the New York Times called the work an “ingenious conceit” and described Gennaro as “an engaging storyteller and skillful mimic.” The New York Post's Bill Ervolino called her “wonderfully appealing and a creator of a colorful gallery of losers, friends and fools.”

In 1991 she performed "Reality Ranch" at the American Place Theatre, dealing with the struggle of a magazine writer to attain self-knowledge in a world of infotainment. The 'New York Times described Gennaro, as “using her disarmingly affable personality to make satiric stabs at quick fading fads that tend to make one feel a step behind the times”.

In 1992 Gennaro completed “Una Donna in Coma”, a play for five actors.

In the aftermath of Hurricane Katrina, Gennaro wrote and performed “Heebie Jeebies” in Culture Project’s Impact on the Gulf Festival, at Chashama in New York City and had an article published.

=== Radio personality ===
Gennaro was a contributor to the syndicated radio show The American Comedy Network, voicing Joan Rivers in the rap record, "Can We Tawk?"

From 1986-1987 Gennaro was a writer/performer on The Joey Reynolds Show on WNBC and was the traffic reporter on The Alan Colmes Show. Gennaro was a substitute host for Lynn Samuels on WABC. She did a limited engagement as “The Weather Girl” on WOR’s Rambling with Gambling in 1998.

Gennaro was the first female writer for Don Imus' show on WFAN (1991-92), humorously rebutting his sexist teasing in character as Leona Helmsley, Diane Sawyer, Jeri Hall and others.

From 2002-2003 Gennaro was a commentator on NPR’s All Things Considered and a character actor in satires written by Bruce Kluger and David Slavin.

=== Fine artist ===
Gennaro's "Articulate Remains", including the "Bones and Egg", "Brides of Bone" and "Kinderdraussen" series, were exhibited at TSL Gallery in Hudson in 2008, and at Rogue Space in Chelsea in 2009. Surrounded by the art, she delivered her monologue “Shaking the Goose Egg”. A review in dArt International magazine state that "The exhibition’s title... refers to the artist giving voice to the objects that she finds in nature... the monologue is a vivid piece of confessional theatre that reveals complex feelings of hope, guilt and responsibility."

In October 2010 her "Feed the Models!" exhibit opened at The World Monuments Fund Gallery in New York City. Vision to Visuals columnist Baldev Duggal wrote “It takes an artist like Gennaro to reflect back to us the truth—the tension that lies beneath the beautiful mirage of carefully doctored aesthetics and loss of self identity.” Feed the Models was featured at Adelphi University in Garden City, New York, and in November 2011–January 2012 was featured at the Fashion Institute of Technology's Fred P. Pomerantz Art and Design Center.

== Acting and voice-over roles ==
Gennaro has appeared on camera in numerous network television commercials, and recorded hundreds of voice-overs for narrations, cartoons, video games, audiobooks, podcasts and promos.

== Filmography ==
=== Animation ===
List of voice performances in animation
Year	Title	Role(s)	Notes
2004	The Wrong Coast	News reporter	Various Celebrity Voices
2010	Team Umizoomi	Ginny	Voice

=== Film ===
Year	Title	Role	Notes
2002	The Wedding Dress	Elevator Lady	Short film
2018	A Bread Factory, Part 2	Ann	
2025	Max Payne: The Killer Was Smiling	Nicole Horne	Short

=== Video games ===
List of voice performances in video games
Year	Title	Role	Notes	Source
2001	Max Payne	Nicole Horne / Computer (voice)	PlayStation 2 / Xbox 360	
2002	Grand Theft Auto: Vice City	Maude Hanson	PC	
2003	Max Payne 2: The Fall of Max Payne	Nicole Horne	Xbox 360	
2012	Max Payne 3	Nicole Horne (voice)	PlayStation 3	
2021	Grand Theft Auto: Vice City - The Definitive Edition	Maude Hanson	PlayStation 5	
