= Timothy Gibbs =

American actor (born 1967)

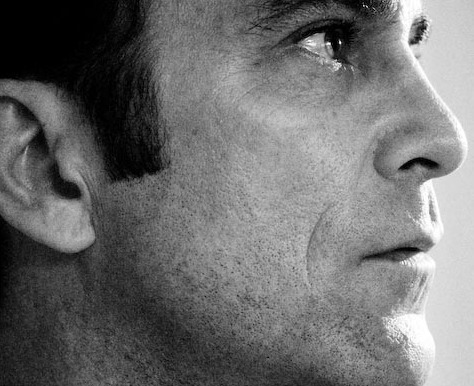
- Gibbs on the set of EXIT
- Born: Timothy Brian Gibbs; April 17, 1967 (age 59); Calabasas, California, U.S.
- Other names: Putter, Keysole, Rim
- Occupation: Actor
- Years active: 1979–present
- Spouse: Lisa Van Wagenen (m. 1998; div. 1999)
- Partner: Patricia Perez Abreu
- Children: 1

Timothy Brian Gibbs (born April 17, 1967) is an American actor who has starred in films, such as 11-11-11 (2011) as Joseph Crone and The Kings of Brooklyn (2004) as Maximilian Sentor and television programs, such as Sex and the City (2000) as Detective Stevens.

== Life and career ==
Gibbs was born in Calabasas, California. He began his acting career at age ten in commercials and later guest starring in television series before getting his first prominent role as Will Adams in the NBC drama series Father Murphy which ran from 1981 to 1983. He also played Chad Everett's son on the short-lived NBC series The Rousters.

He is perhaps best known for starring in soap operas such as Another World as Gary Sinclair from 1995 to 1998 and Santa Barbara as Dash Nichols from 1990 to 1992.

In 2000, Gibbs was nominated for an Emmy award for his portrayal of the fictional character Kevin Buchanan (from 1998 to 2001) on the television series One Life to Live.

In 2003, Gibbs was used as a model for the designing of the video game character Max Payne in the sequel Max Payne 2: The Fall of Max Payne.

Gibbs co-founded the Alkeme Company, a media firm based in Barcelona, Spain and Los Angeles, California.

In 2013, Gibbs created and produced the CIA procedural drama I/Nation, a television series in which he portrays Sidney "Sid" Porter, a self-destructive CIA agent. Gibbs wrote each of the thirteen episodes which make up the show's premier season and directed the series pilot.

In 2015, Gibbs, a lifelong collector, founded Gibbs & Son Ltd, a vintage furniture showroom located in Sant Cugat del Valles, Spain.

== Filmography ==
- The Jeffersons (1979) – Binky
- Goldie and the Boxer Go to Hollywood (1981) – Artie
- Father Murphy (1981–1983) – Will Adams
- The Rousters (1983) – Michael Earp
- The Get Along Gang (1984) – Catchum Crocodile
- Just Between Friends (1986) – Jeff Davis
- The Deliberate Stranger (1986) – John
- The Kindred (1987) - Hart Phillips
- Growing Pains (1987) – Jerry Delish
- Police Story: The Watch Commander (1988) – Off. John Reynolds
- Father Dowling Mysteries (1990) – Rick McMasters
- Santa Barbara (1990 to 1992) – Dash Nichols
- Secrets (1992) TV mini-series .... Claude Rodier
- Witchboard 2: The Devil's Doorway (1993) – Mitch
- Another World (1995–1998) – Gary Sinclair
- One Life to Live (1998–2001) – Lt. Governor Kevin Lord Riley Buchanan
- Sex and the City (2000) – Detective Stevens
- Season of the Hunted (2003) – Steve
- The Kings of Brooklyn (2004) – Sentor
- 11-11-11 (2011) – Joseph Crone
- Tasting Menu (2012) – Daniel Duncan
- I/Nation (2013) – Sidney Porter
