= Max Payne (film) =

- Theatrical release poster
- Directed by: John Moore
- Screenplay by: Beau Thorne
- Based on: Max Payne by Remedy Entertainment
- Produced by: John Moore; Scott Faye; Julie Yorn
- Starring: Mark Wahlberg; Mila Kunis; Beau Bridges; Chris "Ludacris" Bridges; Olga Kurylenko
- Cinematography: Jonathan Sela
- Edited by: Dan Zimmerman
- Music by: Marco Beltrami; Buck Sanders
- Production companies: Dune Entertainment; Firm Films; Foxtor Productions
- Distributed by: 20th Century Fox
- Release date: October 17, 2008 (United States)
- Running time: 100 minutes
- Countries: United States; Canada
- Language: English
- Budget: $35 million
- Box office: $85.8 million

Max Payne is a 2008 neo-noir action film based on the video game series of the same name developed by Remedy Entertainment and published by Rockstar Games. Directed and co-produced by John Moore and written by Beau Thorne, the film stars Mark Wahlberg as the title character, Mila Kunis as Mona Sax, Ludacris as Jim Bravura, and Beau Bridges as B.B. Hensley. The film revolves around revenge, centering on the New York police detective as he journeys through New York City's criminal underworld while trying to learn the truth behind the murder of his wife and child.

Filming took place in spring, 2008. Extensive visual effects were used in many scenes in the film. Max Payne was released on October 16, 2008, in Australia, one day prior to the United States release date. The film received generally negative reviews and grossed $85.8 million against a production budget of $35 million.

== Plot ==
Max Payne is a detective assigned to the NYPD Cold Case Unit. He lost his wife Michelle and infant daughter Rose in a horrific murder; since that day, Max has been consumed by the desire to find his family's killer. He comes under suspicion from the NYPD when Natasha, an acquaintance of one of Max's informants, is brutally murdered and Max's wallet (which she had stolen) is found at the crime scene. Max's former partner, Alex Balder, is slain in his home after informing Max of a possible connection between Natasha's death and his family's murder. Max is framed as a murderer, and Lt. Bravura of Internal Affairs is tasked with bringing him in.

Max and Mona Sax, a freelance assassin and Natasha's sister, visit Natasha's tattoo parlor, where the tattoo artist reveals the meaning behind a tattoo that Natasha had: it represents the wings of a Valkyrie, which, in Norse mythology, are creatures that decide the fate of warriors in battle. Max goes to secretly take some of Michelle's belongings out of storage and finds that documents from when she worked at the Aesir Corporation, a major pharmaceutical manufacturer, have gone missing. Max interrogates Michelle's former supervisor, Jason Colvin, in his office at Aesir and learns that Michelle was involved with the development of Valkyr, a drug that the company produced under military contract in an attempt to create super-soldiers. Unfortunately, only a few subjects showed positive results; the rest saw hallucinations and eventually went insane, forcing Aesir to terminate the project and cover up their involvement. Jason agrees to testify against his employers, as long as Max can protect him. Max agrees, but then SWAT officers (Aesir contractors in disguise) raid the office, killing Jason and attracting Bravura's attention.

After an intense gunfight, Max escapes with the evidence and shows Mona a video explaining the Valkyr project and featuring Jack Lupino, a former Marine who was one of Aesir's successful test subjects. Lupino explains in the video that while taking the drug, he feels invincible, and suffers none of the side effects. Max confronts Lupino, now a powerful gangster involved with the trafficking of Valkyr as a designer drug, at his warehouse hideout, and the two men fight until Lupino gains the upper hand. Max's defeat appears certain until B.B. - Aesir's head of security and a father figure to Max - arrives and shoots Lupino dead. He then has Max knocked out and brought to the city docks.

B.B. explains that he has been secretly selling Valkyr for personal profit and admits to killing Michelle after she found incriminating evidence that could have exposed him. He tries to drown Max in a faked suicide, but Max breaks free and dives into the icy river. He almost drowns, but hears the voice of his wife telling him it is not yet time for him to die. He swims to shore and, to prevent hypothermia, consumes vials of Valkyr stuffed in his pockets by B.B., which causes him to see intense hallucinations but also makes him nigh-invincible. Max follows B.B. back to the Aesir Corporation's headquarters. Assisted by Mona, he shoots his way through the building's security, eventually confronting and killing B.B. on the building's helipad. His vengeance is complete, and he falls to his knees, ready to die. He sees a vision of his wife and child smiling at him, and suddenly comes to, as the sun cuts through the clouds and a SWAT team surrounds him.

A post-credits scene shows Max and Mona in a bar. Mona shows Max a newspaper with Aesir CEO Nicole Horne's picture on the front. Max and Mona then look at one another with understanding and renewed purpose.

== Cast ==
The minute I played the game I saw Mark. I was delighted that he agreed to do it. I was also very nervous because if he'd said "no", I really didn't have a go-to guy. If he'd turned me down, I don't think the project would have happened.

— John Moore, director
- Mark Wahlberg as Max Payne: An NYPD officer out for revenge against his family's killer. When Wahlberg first read the script he thought it was "awesome", but was wary after finding out it was based on a video game. While describing his role, Wahlberg has said, "It's probably one of the edgier roles I've played but also the most layered. Here's a very happy guy who worked a dismal job, and had a beautiful family. But the beauty in his life was taken away. He just goes on a rampage. It's all driven by emotion."
- Mila Kunis as Mona Sax: A Russian-American assassin who seeks revenge for the murder of her sister. Kunis had played the video game before reading the script but did not progress very far into it. Kunis' favorite part in preparing for the role was weapons training and safety which included disassembling and rebuilding an MP5K blindfolded.
- Beau Bridges as B.B. Hensley: A former cop and the ex-partner of Max Payne's father, now employed as head of security for the Aesir Corporation. Bridges had never heard of the game but since his children were excited to learn about his role they convinced him it would be a big movie.
- Kate Burton as Nicole Horne: CEO of Aesir Corporation.
- Ludacris as Lieutenant Jim Bravura: An officer assigned to Internal Affairs who is investigating Max and leads the effort to arrest him. The role was originally written for a 60-year-old man, but after auditioning, Ludacris got the call from Moore and had the part.
- Chris O'Donnell as Jason Colvin: A top executive of the Aesir Corporation, described as Nicole Horne's "right-hand man".
- Nelly Furtado as Christa Balder: Wife of Alex Balder.
- Donal Logue as Alex Balder: An NYPD detective and Max Payne's former partner.
- Amaury Nolasco as Jack Lupino: A former Gunnery Sergeant in the United States Marine Corps who became one of the earliest test subjects for Valkyr. He subsequently started trafficking Valkyr for profit.
- Olga Kurylenko as Natasha Sax: Mona's sister.
- Joel Gordon as Owen Green: A Valkyr addict and Natasha's friend.
- Jamie Hector as Lincoln DeNeuf: A Haitian crime boss and contact of Mona's.
- Stephen R. Hart as Tattoo Artist.
- James McCaffrey as Jack Taliente, an FBI agent, in an uncredited role. McCaffrey provides the voice of Max Payne in the video game series.
- Marianthi Evans as Michelle Payne: Max Payne's wife, who was murdered along with her baby daughter.

== Production ==
=== Development ===
The 2001 video game Max Payne was optioned by the production company Collision Entertainment to produce a live-action film adaptation. By April 2002, distributors Dimension Films and Abandon Entertainment were attached to the project. Shawn Ryan, the creator of the television series The Shield, was hired to write a script for the planned film. By June 2005, without production starting, Collision Entertainment had taken the project to 20th Century Fox. In November 2007, with a script written by Beau Thorne, Fox announced John Moore as the director and Mark Wahlberg as the title star.

=== Filming ===
Filming began in Toronto on March 2, 2008, and wrapped by May 9, 2008. Shooting the film in 35 mm 3-perf, several different areas around Toronto were used for multiple locations in the movie, including the old Daily Bread food bank building at Bathurst & Lakeshore. It took a full week to shoot just the final gunfight inside the Aesir Headquarters using more than 6,000 squibs.

Soho VFX created New York City behind the helipad set.

Upon finding the building for the Aesir Headquarters it took eight weeks in pre-production to build the set and another week for the special effects team to install the squibs. The outside top half of the building was completely made of CG, by Mr.X, giving it a more high tech look. Using Google Earth they were able to find out the building's geometry. No location could be found for a rooftop helipad so a set was built in front of a green screen. Soho VFX attached the helipad to the building and set it atop New York City.

A high-speed camera was used to create a bullet time effect for this shot, called "Boom Vision".

In order to recreate the bullet time used in the games without using a complex camera setup, the technique used is called "Boom Vision". Moore used Vision Research's Phantom HD digital camera which takes 1,000 fps. When the video is played back, it gives the illusion of slow motion, a method of high-speed photography. The technique was used for two action scenes and required the construction of a special rigging that had the camera on a propeller that spun at two revolutions per second. The crew was not allowed near it while it was being used for fear of damaging the camera or getting injured. Soho FX then blended the thousands of shots into the other footage during post-production.

A contest was held between visual effects teams to see who could create the best drug-induced hallucinations. A reel was shot from actual set locations, it also included footage in front of a green screen with a stand-in for Wahlberg. The reel was then sent to ten different teams where Canadian company Spin created the best demo reel. To win Spin changed the falling snow into burning embers over a matte New York skyline painting. During the climactic hallucination scene, the entire room was to be torn apart from the ceiling down around Max. A camera on a track circled Max and Spin later "recreated the ceiling in CG, so it could break away and reveal the Valkyrie world above."

Moore gave the approval on Valkyrie designed by illustrators Chris Roswarne and Rob McCallum. As a point of reference and to limit the use of CG a Valkyrie suit and makeup were worn by performer Mako Hindy. Moore "wanted the Valkyries to have a slow motion quality to them, almost as if they were underwater." During the 15 weeks of post-production the Valkyries were further developed by Spin to support this. Using Maya, 3DS Max, and ZBrush they were able to create the Valkyries and have control over their wings. The artists sometimes had full control over each individual feather. They had to overcome the darkness of the film as it made it more difficult to track each object. Spin also handled atmospheric CG and the CG matte backdrop elements.

=== Rating ===
Above: Unrated. Below: PG-13. As seen on the DVD, Moore had to remove some of the blood to get a PG-13 rating.

Though filmed with the intention of receiving a PG-13 rating, Max Payne received an unofficial R rating by the MPAA on September 5, 2008. Moore, angered that the equally dark The Dark Knight received a PG-13 rating when Payne received an R, said "The MPAA changes their rules willy-nilly and it depends on who's seeing your actual movie at the time. It's very difficult to get a hold of what's acceptable."

On September 22, 2008, a trailer confirmed a PG-13 rating, "for violence including intense shooting sequences, drug content, some sexuality, and brief strong language." Director John Moore confirmed in an interview with GameDaily's John Gaudiosi that the film was awarded the PG-13 rating without any major changes being made to the film. Describing the re-editing process Moore stated, "We trimmed some frames more for the sake of trimming frames than anything, but we got the rating without any major changes at all."

The film is rated PG-13 in the United States, a departure from the M-rated video game series. Mila Kunis said of the tone-down, "It's incredibly dark. You still get the gist of it. The only difference between R-rated and PG-13 is you might not see as much blood. You might not see blood squirting everywhere, but as far as the sadness and the darkness of it and the distraught [nature] of these human beings is very much captured in the film." The film was given the 15 rating in the United Kingdom, for "strong violence" and MA 15+ in Australia for "Frequent violence and drug use".

=== Music ===
The film's score is composed by Marco Beltrami and Buck Sanders. Beltrami made use of a detuned piano with violins, violas, and cellos. The song featured in the trailer is "If I Was Your Vampire" by Marilyn Manson.

== Release ==
=== Critical response ===
On Rotten Tomatoes the film has an approval rating of 15% based on 136 reviews, with an average rating of 3.90/10. The site's critics consensus reads: "While it boasts some stylish action, Max Payne suffers severely from an illogical plot and overdirection." Metacritic gave the film a weighted average score of 31 out of 100 based on 25 critics, indicating "generally unfavorable reviews". Audiences surveyed by CinemaScore gave the film an average grade of "C" on an A+ to F scale.

Louise Keller said "The most striking element is the production design..." Bruce Paterson wrote for the Australian Film Critics Association that "Mark Wahlberg is terrific in hard-bitten roles", but in a reference to the Valkyries concluded, "it could have done with more of the Norse and less of the force." Critic Armond White has defended the film stating that Moore "explores genuine, contemporary anxiety [and that] his images are richer than his plots."

On IGN, Jim Vejvoda said: "It also doesn't help that Wahlberg gives a drab performance..." and "the rest of the cast doesn't fare much better." He stated that gamers will be disappointed when comparing it to the game and even as a revenge film there is not much here. IGN went on to give Max Payne the "Best Videogame Adaptation" award of 2008, noting "this is how sad games-to-film have become that the only one worthy of being named the "best" of the year is a movie that we panned."

Kirk Honeycutt of The Hollywood Reporter was critical of Thorne's screenplay, stating, "[Thorne] knows enough about cinema to borrow from here and there but not old enough to be embarrassed about how badly he does so." Honeycutt said that the film was too reliant on its visuals to disguise problems with the script's predictable plot points.

One of the harshest critics of the film, 3D Realms CEO Scott Miller, one of the game's producers, cited fundamental story flaws "that have me shaking my head in bewilderment," including the game's opening scenes being instead placed in the middle of the film. After the film's No. 1 opening weekend, however, he retracted his comments, saying that he was now "proud of the film," and that "this kind of opening brings us a lot closer to the reality of a sequel" to the long-stalled video game series.

=== Awards ===
Mark Wahlberg received a Golden Raspberry Award nomination for Worst Actor for his performance in the film (also for The Happening), but "lost" to Mike Myers for The Love Guru.

=== Box office ===
Max Payne opened at No. 1 at the box office, with $17,639,849 during its first weekend against newcomers Sex Drive, The Secret Life of Bees, and W. The film earned $40,689,393 domestically, and $44,727,512 overseas, making a worldwide total of $85,416,905. While it is not considered an overwhelming success, its U.S. gross was around the same range as other video game adaptations such as Hitman, Silent Hill, and Resident Evil. Its international gross was lower than both Silent Hill and Hitman, and it was significantly lower than that of the six live-action Resident Evil films released to date. The film ranks nineteenth in U.S. box-office gross revenues for video game adaptions.

=== Home media ===
The film was released on DVD and Blu-ray on January 20, 2009, and as of August 2009 generated $25,915,457 in DVD sales. All versions contain the theatrical and the uncut versions of the film, and the Blu-ray and the 2-disc DVD contain the "Michelle Payne Animated Graphic Novel" as well as a digital copy of the uncut version of the film. The uncut version features only 3 minutes of additional footage compared to the theatrical release. The most notable difference is the extra CGI blood. Only the Blu-ray release features a D-BOX motion code. It went on to receive a score of 7 out of 10 on IGN, being described as "a first-rate transfer that manages to show off the range of the high-definition format with few, if any, real weaknesses".

== Differences from the game ==
The film is loosely based on the video game of the same name developed by Remedy Entertainment in 2001. The number of differences between the game and the film caused the CEO of 3D Realms and the producer behind the game, Scott Miller, to make a public statement against the film. Miller disliked that the film's audience did not initially understand why Max was seeking revenge. A flashback scene where Max finds his family murdered was right at the beginning of the game, as opposed to being shown in the middle of the film. He was also surprised that one of the story's main villains, Jack Lupino, is killed by B.B. Hensley, whereas in the game, Max kills Lupino. The end scene was also changed from Max killing Nicole Horne by shooting out the tower's lightning rods' guy wires and dropping it on her helicopter to Max shooting B.B. on top of the helipad; B.B. was also presented as being responsible for the trafficking of Valkyr, whereas in the game, his role was simply that of a crooked cop who betrayed Max and his death was in a shootout at a parking garage. A large segment of the video game featuring Max discovering an old government laboratory producing Valkyr (and learning why his family was killed) was completely absent from the film.

Many fans of the original game were confused by the addition of the demonic creatures. These creatures seemingly represented Valkyries, though in Norse mythology Valkyries are female warriors and not demonic beings. The film has a much larger element of the supernatural than the game, as it is never revealed in the film if they are part of the hallucinations. The scene where Max is forced to ingest Valkyr, causing him to experience intense hallucinations of his guilt and pain, is shown in the film as him doing so in a desperate attempt to prevent hypothermia after jumping in the water to escape from B.B. and his henchman. However, in the game, he was forced to take it by Nicole Horne at gunpoint after discovering her involvement with Mafia boss Angelo Punchinello and was subsequently left for dead as Punchinello's manor was burned down.

There is also a noticeable lack of bullet-time from the action sequences, despite that being a large part of the appeal of the video game. There was some bullet time slow down but it was only used at the end of the movie.

== Reboot ==
In June 2022, 20th Century Studios announced that a Max Payne reboot is in development.

== See also ==
- The Egyptian, another Hollywood adaptation of a Finnish property.
- List of films based on video games
