= Max Payne 2: The Fall of Max Payne =

2003 video game

- Developer: Remedy Entertainment (Note: Ported to Xbox and PlayStation 2 by Rockstar Vienna)
- Publisher: Rockstar Games
- Director: Markus Mäki
- Designer: Petri Järvilehto
- Programmer: Kim Salo
- Artist: Saku Lehtinen
- Writer: Sam Lake
- Composers: Kärtsy Hatakka; Kimmo Kajasto
- Series: Max Payne
- Platforms: Windows; Xbox; PlayStation 2
- Release: 15 October 2003: Windows; NA: 15 October 2003; EU: 24 October 2003 Xbox; NA: 25 November 2003; EU: 5 December 2003 PlayStation 2; NA: 2 December 2003; EU: 5 December 2003
- Genre: Third-person shooter
- Mode: Single-player

Max Payne 2: The Fall of Max Payne is a 2003 third-person shooter game developed by Remedy Entertainment and published by Rockstar Games. It is the sequel to 2001's Max Payne and the second game in the Max Payne series. Set two years after the events of the first game, the sequel finds Max Payne working again as a detective for the New York City Police Department (NYPD), while struggling with nightmares about his troubled past. After being unexpectedly reunited with contract killer Mona Sax, Max must work with her to resolve a conspiracy filled with death and betrayal, which will test where his true loyalties lie.

Max Payne 2 is played from a third-person perspective. Throughout the single-player campaign, players mainly control Max, with Mona being playable in a few select levels. Both playable characters have access to a wide variety of weapons to eliminate enemies, as well as a bullet-time ability, which slows down time during combat. The bullet-time mechanic has been upgraded in the game to allow players to move faster as they kill more enemies, as well as reload weapons instantly. Due to the Havok physics engine being used, the game also features improved ragdoll physics. The story is again told mostly through graphic novel panels with voice-overs, although several traditional cutscenes are also used. Whereas the first game's plot was inspired by Norse mythology and traditional hard-boiled detective novels, the sequel is mostly based on tragic love stories like those seen in film noir, with Max and Mona's relationship being central to the game's narrative.

Max Payne 2 was released for Windows in October 2003, for the Xbox in November, and for the PlayStation 2 in December. The game received highly positive reviews from critics and, like its predecessor, has been cited as one of the greatest video games ever made. Praise focused on its action and story, while criticism targeted its short length. Despite the positive reception, the game sold poorly, leading Rockstar Games' parent company Take-Two Interactive to cite Max Payne 2's sales as a cause for the company's reforecast finances of 2004. Max Payne 2 received several industry awards, including Outstanding Art Direction at the Golden Satellite Awards 2004, and Editors' Choice Awards from GamePro, IGN, and GameSpy. A sequel, Max Payne 3, was released by Rockstar in May 2012. Remakes of Max Payne 1 & 2 are in development by Remedy and will be published by Rockstar for PlayStation 5, Windows, and Xbox Series X/S.

== Gameplay ==
Max performs a shoot-dodge maneuver.

Max Payne 2 is a third-person shooter featuring linear levels spread across three distinct chapters. Throughout the majority of the game, the player assumes the role of returning protagonist Max Payne; in several levels from the second and third chapters, the player controls secondary protagonist Mona Sax. Initially, the player's weapon is a 9mm pistol. As they progress, the player gains access to more powerful weapons including other handguns, shotguns, submachine guns, assault rifles, sniper rifles, and hand-thrown weapons. To move the game along, the player is told what the next objective is through Max's internal monologue, in which Max iterates what his next steps should be.

When first played, the game offers one difficulty level that is adjusted automatically if the game is too difficult for the player. For example, if the player's character dies too many times, the enemies' artificial intelligence is made less effective, while more health in the form of painkillers is made available. After completing the game once, other difficulty levels are unlocked. Two special game modes are also activated: New York Minute and Dead Man Walking. In New York Minute, the player is given a score based on the time taken to complete each level. The Dead Man Walking mode places Max in one of five scenarios, in which he must survive for as long as possible while fighting off endlessly respawning enemies.

Max Payne 2 allows the player to enable bullet-time, a mode that slows time, while still allowing the player to aim in real-time, to give the player more time to determine what they want to do. In this mode, the screen's color changes to a sepia tone to act as a visual cue. When in use, the bullet time meter will decrease until it is either empty or the player disables bullet time mode. The meter will eventually increase when not in use, and can be replenished quickly by killing enemies. To simulate the bullet time effect, the character can also execute a shoot-dodge maneuver. When the maneuver is performed, Max or Mona jumps in a direction specified by the player, and although bullet time is activated while Max or Mona is in mid-air, this will not deplete the bullet time meter. The combat system has been improved for Max Payne 2; the player can arm Max or Mona with a secondary weapon such as a grenade or Molotov cocktail, and when near an enemy, they can pistol whip them. AI companions can occasionally come to Max's aid, although their deaths do not affect the gameplay or story.

== Plot ==
Comic panels are used as cutscenes to provide plot exposition in the game.

Two years after the events of the first game, Max Payne (James McCaffrey) has been acquitted of the charges against him and reinstated in his old job as a detective for the NYPD, thanks to his connections to the Inner Circle secret society. The story is narrated from Max's perspective, who recalls the events of the past few days. The first flashback takes place in the hospital, where Max is recovering from a gunshot wound. Several assassins raid the hospital to try and kill him, but Max avoids them and makes his way to the morgue, where he finds the body of a woman he has recently killed. The game then goes back further in time, to a few nights prior.

While investigating a gunfight at a warehouse owned by his ally, Russian mobster Vladimir "Vlad" Lem (Jonathan Davis), Max encounters a group of hitmen called "the Cleaners", who raided the warehouse for guns. Max is also surprised to run into contract killer Mona Sax (Wendy Hoopes), who he thought had died two years ago. Max heads to Vlad's restaurant to question him about the raid, only to find him under attack by mobsters led by their mutual enemy, Vinnie Gognitti (Fred Berman). After saving Vlad, he claims that Vinnie, now the underboss of the Punchinello Crime Family, is trying to monopolize the black market arms trade and sees Vlad as a threat.

After evading an attack by the Cleaners in his apartment, Max tracks Mona to an abandoned funhouse and learns that the Cleaners are trying to eliminate anyone who knows about the Inner Circle. While tracking down Mona's contact within the Inner Circle, Max discovers that he has been killed by the Cleaners, and Mona is arrested by the NYPD for being a wanted suspect in the murder of a senator. While at the police station, Max overhears his colleague, Valerie Winterson (Jennifer Server), talking on the phone about Mona, moments before the Cleaners attack the station to kill Mona. She manages to escape and, after fighting off a Cleaner attack on her hideout, sets out to hunt down those responsible with Max's help.

Their search leads them to a construction site, which Max and Mona discover is being used as a base by the Cleaners. After killing most of them, the duo are confronted by Winterson, who holds Mona at gunpoint; Mona claims that Winterson is there to kill her, while Winterson insists that she is simply trying to arrest a fleeing fugitive. After several moments of consideration, Max fatally shoots Winterson, allowing Mona to escape. Before she dies, Winterson shoots Max, hospitalizing him. The game then returns to the earlier hospital scene, where Max eliminates the Cleaners trying to kill him and escapes. He decides to visit Senator Alfred Woden (John Braden), the leader of the Inner Circle, who reveals that Vlad is the mastermind behind the Cleaners and is using them to eliminate his opposition in order to take over both the Inner Circle and New York's criminal underworld.

Now aware of Vlad's deception, Max raids his restaurant, but finds that Vlad has already left to kill Vinnie. He also discovers that Winterson was Vlad's mistress and was secretly helping him. Max manages to save Vinnie from Vlad's men, and the two head to Mona's hideout to seek her help. However, Vlad ambushes them, murdering Vinnie and shooting Max for killing Winterson. Vlad also reveals that Mona is working for Woden, and that Woden indirectly caused the deaths of Max's family five years prior by sending the Project Valhalla file to the district attorney's office to expose Nicole Horne's (Jane Gennaro) crimes, resulting in Max's wife, Michelle, accidentally discovering the file.

After Mona rescues Max, the two head to Woden's mansion to save him from Vlad. They eliminate Vlad's men, but Mona suddenly betrays Max and attempts to follow her orders to kill him. When Mona finds herself unable to do so because of her feelings for him, Vlad shoots her, then kills Woden when the latter confronts him. Max fights Vlad as the mansion burns around them, and eventually kills him. As the police arrive at the scene, Max returns to Mona, who dies in his arms. Despite this, Max has come to terms with all the tragedy in his life, and is ready to move on. In an alternate ending unlocked on the highest difficulty, Mona survives, and she and Max kiss.

== Development ==
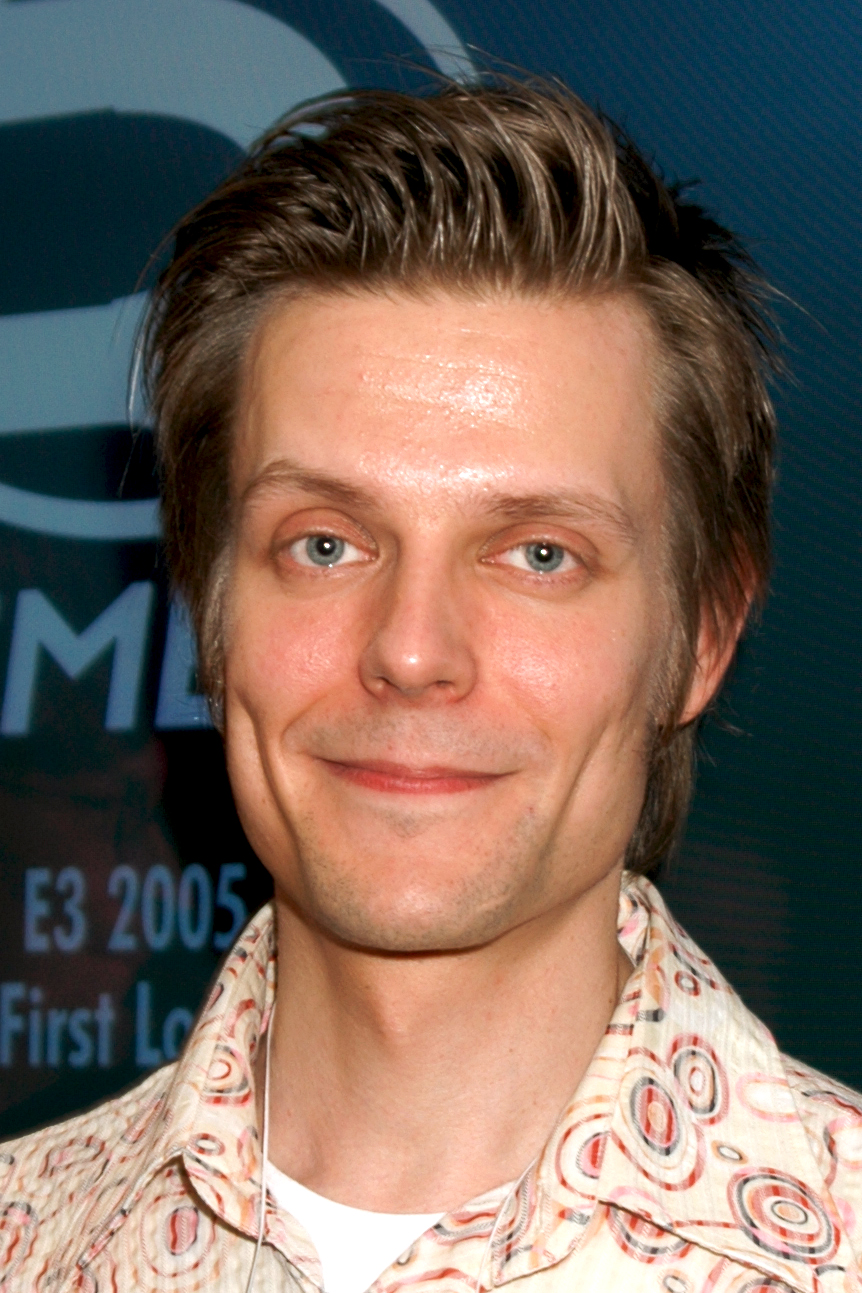
The game's plot was written by Sam Lake, who also modeled as the titular character in the original Max Payne.

Take-Two Interactive issued a press release on 5 December 2001 that announced its acquisition of the Max Payne franchise from Remedy Entertainment and 3D Realms for US$10 million in cash and 970,000 shares of common stock, and its plans to release Max Payne 2. On 22 May 2002, Take-Two announced that they agreed to pay up to $8 million as incentive payments to 3D Realms and Remedy Entertainment to develop Max Payne 2. On 3 September 2003, Take-Two officially announced a release date of 15 October 2003 for the game.

Originally modeled in Max Payne after the game's writer Sam Lake, Max's appearance was remodeled after professional actor Timothy Gibbs for Max Payne 2; James McCaffrey returned as the voice of Max. The game's plot was written by Lake, who decided to write it as a "film noir love story", as he felt that it suited Max's persona the best. Lake hoped that the story would break new ground, noting, "At least it's a step into the right direction. I'd like nothing better than to see new and unexpected subject matters to find their way to games and stories told in games." Lake remarked that basic, archetypal film noir elements found in many classics of the genre "can go a long way" when telling a story, and gave examples that included a hostile, crime-ridden city; a story that takes place late at night with heavy rain; and a cynical, hard-boiled detective down on his luck. Lake considered writing a sequel to Max Payne an "art of its own". Since the setting and characters were already established, Lake decided that the primary goal of the sequel was "to keep what's good and fix what was not so good", and to take the story in surprising directions. The screenplay for the sequel ended up being three times longer than the one for Max Payne. Lake predicted that the more complex story would add to the game's replay value.

The story, sometimes told through in-game dialogue, is pushed forward with comic panels that play during cut scenes. The developers found comic panels to be more effective and less costly to use in the cut scenes than fully animated cinematics. They also noted that the graphic novel format allowed the player to interpret each panel for themselves, explaining "the nuances are there in the head of the reader, and it would be much harder to reach that level with in-game or even prerendered cinematics." The developers also found it easier to reorganize the comic panels if the plot needed to be changed while developing the game.

Max Payne 2 uses the same game engine as the one used in Max Payne, but with several significant upgrades. Even though the game only supports DirectX 8.1, the graphics in Max Payne 2 mimic those generated by DirectX 9 by making optimal use of effects such as reflection, refraction, shaders, and ghosting. The developers considered one particular scene in which effects are used well: When Max has lucid dreams, the screen appears fuzzy and out of focus. Since Max Payne, the polygon count (the number of polygons rendered per frame) has been increased, which smooths out the edges of character models. In addition, characters have a much greater range of expressions. Previously, Max had only one expression available; in Max Payne 2, he often smirks and moves his eyebrows to react to different scenarios.

The game uses the Havok physics engine, which the developers chose because it was "hands-down the best solution to our needs". They found that a dedicated physics engine was vital to create Max's combat scenes, which Max Payne was known for, "with increased realism and dramatic, movielike action". The physics engine made several situations seem more realistic. For example, when in combat, the player can take cover behind boxes; however, when enemy bullets impact the boxes, they will topple over, in which case the player will have to find another suitable object to use for cover. When an enemy is hidden behind a wall divider, the player can throw a grenade next to it to send the cover flying through the air, rendering the enemy unprotected. The Havok engine was tweaked to make weapons, bombs, and Molotov cocktails act more naturally, and the audio was updated to make them sound more realistic. The new physics engine allowed for certain actions that could not happen in Max Payne; boxes can be moved and follow the laws of gravitation, and explosion detonations make enemy bodies fall realistically.

The bullet time mode that Max Payne was known for was improved; the developers referred to it as "version 2.0". The mode, which allows Max to move in slow motion to react and kill enemies more easily, was enhanced to give Max a refill of a portion of the Bullet Time gauge, as well as slowing down the passage time even further, as Max moves further "into the zone" with each consecutive kill. This was done to encourage players to aggressively dive head-on into dangerous situations rather than crouching at a safe distance and waiting for enemies to come to them. A new reload animation was also introduced, which, when Max reloads while in Bullet Time, allows him to duck to avoid bullets, spin around to survey the combat situation, and briefly pause to give the player a moment to think of a strategy. Development tools were made available for Max Payne 2 by Rockstar Games and Remedy Entertainment to allow players to create modifications for the game. Modifications can perform several functions, such as the ability to add new weapons, skills, perspectives, surroundings, and characters.

Music composers Kärtsy Hatakka and Kimmo Kajasto returned to compose the game's soundtrack. It features cello performances by Apocalyptica member Perttu Kivilaakso. The game's end credits feature the song "Late Goodbye" by the band Poets of the Fall, the lyrics of which were based on a poem by Sam Lake. It was their first single and reached #14 on the Finnish Singles Chart as well as #1 on Radio Suomipop's Top 30 chart. It is referenced many times in the game, usually by characters singing or humming it.

=== Anti-piracy ===
When Rockstar Games released the game on Steam, they used a no-disc crack to bypass their originally included DRM.

== Reception ==
Reception

Aggregate score
Aggregator	Score
Metacritic	PC: 86/100; XBOX: 84/100; PS2: 73/100

Review scores
Publication	Score
1Up.com	PC: B−
GameSpot	PC: 9.0/10
GameSpy	PC: 5/5
GameZone	XBOX: 9.3/10
IGN	PC: 9.4/10
The Toronto Sun	PC: 4.5/5
The New Zealand Herald	XBOX: 4/5
The Daily Telegraph (Aus)	PC: 5/5
The Sydney Morning Herald	PC: 4/5
The Sunday Times	PC: 2/5

Max Payne 2 received "generally favorable" reviews from critics, while the PS2 version received "mixed or average" reviews, according to review aggregator website Metacritic.

Steve Polak of the Australian The Daily Telegraph, who enjoyed the first Max Payne game, also praised Max Payne 2, calling it an "outstanding" game that "keeps alive the sense of atmosphere and engaging gunplay-oriented action that was so exciting in the first release." He lauded the game for better production values compared to the first game, including its more polished story, more professional scripts, and better acting and graphics. The complexity of Max's character was a welcomed element by Polak, who found that games often created heroes that were simplistic. The Sydney Morning Herald's Dan Toose described the game's experience as "brutal, yet beautiful gun-blazing gaming".

Jon Minifie of The New Zealand Herald appreciated the game's story, calling it an "entertainingly dark third-person shooter with a well-crafted, noir storyline". In particular, Minifie praised Remedy for what he deemed a successful port of the game to consoles, especially for the Xbox, noticing that the version features visuals that look similar to those on the PC. However, he found that the PlayStation 2 port was only "an okay job" that resulted in quality that was "considerably less easy on the eye", and asserted that it is outperformed by more powerful platforms. The Sunday Times's Steven Poole observed that Max Payne 2 does "exactly the same [things as the first game], only better." He found that enemies react convincingly to damage taken from bullets, thanks to the physics engine. Ultimately, however, Poole described the game as "entertaining but not earth-shattering".

The Toronto Sun's Steve Tilley, who believed that Remedy did a "killer job" on Max Payne 2, felt that the company kept what was great about the previous game, "while everything else has been tweaked, overhauled and juiced up". He was a fan of the bullet time from the first game, and therefore appreciated seeing it return in the sequel, with "even more impressive" visuals. Tilley found that the game's "lifelike physics engine" was easily its best aspect, and noted that while playing the game, he threw a grenade across a room, which resulted in an explosion that sent enemies flying through the air in a realistic fashion. In addition, Tilley applauded Remedy for listening to fan complaints and resolving issues from the previous game, including improved dream sequences in Max Payne 2. He was, however, disappointed with the general linearity of the game, and noted that players who are not interested in film noir themes will not enjoy them in Max Payne 2. Concluding, Tilley commented that the game "has enough polish, cinematic flair and outright mayhem to thrill those who like their Sopranos with a dash of John Woo and a touch of Frank Miller."

The game's action was praised by several reviewers. GameZone called it cinematic and action-packed, noting that the final scene was worthy of the big screen. Similarly, GameSpy described the action as "adrenaline-pumping", and considered it comparable to what was available in film. The story was both applauded and criticized. Tom McNamara of IGN enjoyed playing in the film noir setting and believed that it adds dramatic depth to Max and Mona's story, "somehow [making] what's going on more important and interesting. Wreaking havoc is nice, but it's great to also have a love interest complicating things, and Mona Sax is definitely up to the task." However, he was turned off by some of the "hammy" dialogue. In contrast, 1UP.com cited the final boss as an ending that inadequately completed an otherwise excellent game, and the Sunday Times' Poole called the story "pungently cheesy". Max Payne 2's length disappointed critics, including GameSpot and IGN, which complained about the short story. Toose of the Sydney Morning Herald was also critical of the short single-player experience, but found that the higher difficulty levels and special "survivor" modes helped improve the game's replay value.

=== Sales ===
Despite a positive reception, Max Payne 2 sold poorly, leading Rockstar Games' parent company Take-Two Interactive to cite the "continued disappointing sales of Max Payne 2: The Fall of Max Payne" as one of the causes for the company's reforecasted sales for 2004. By June 2005, Max Payne 2: The Fall of Max Payne sold 950,000 copies in the United States.

=== Awards ===
Max Payne 2 was the recipient of several industry awards, including Outstanding Art Direction at the Golden Satellite Awards 2004, Editors' Choice Awards from GamePro, IGN, GameSpy, and GameSpot, and Game of the Month from Game Informer.

During the 7th Annual Interactive Achievement Awards, the Academy of Interactive Arts & Sciences nominated Max Payne 2 for "Game of the Year", "Computer Game of the Year", "Computer Action/Adventure Game of the Year", "Console Action/Adventure Game of the Year", and "Outstanding Achievement in Character Performance - Male" for James McCaffrey's vocal portrayal of Max Payne.

== Remake ==
In April 2022, Remedy announced that it is remaking Max Payne and Max Payne 2 on its Northlight Engine, with funding from Rockstar. The two remakes are set to be released as a compilation for PlayStation 5, Windows, and Xbox Series X/S.

== See also ==
- List of fictional portrayals of the NYPD
- List of third-person shooters
