= Stephen R. Hart =

Canadian actor (born 1958)

- Born: March 11, 1958 (age 67)
- Occupation: Actor
- Years active: 1992–present
- Height: 2.11 m (6 ft 11 in)

Stephen R. Hart (born March 11, 1958) is a Canadian actor known for his great height at 2.11 m (6 ft 11 in) and his deep voice. He is also known for his role as "The Voice" on The Current. Other film credits include Resident Evil: Apocalypse, Silent Hill, Shoot 'Em Up and Max Payne. Hart played the main antagonist in an episode of the TV series Fear Itself on NBC.

== Early life, family and education ==
Hart has Danish ancestry.

== Additional career ==
In 1976, as a member of the Canadian Armed Forces, he was an armed escort at the Montreal Olympics for International Olympic Delegates.

He sang a duet of "Let's Call the Whole Thing Off" with Canadian former Prime Minister Kim Campbell on an episode of the radio program The Current. Hart also achieved celebrity status in Canada, while performing as The Scandinavian Giant (due to his Danish ancestry) with Carnival Diablo, a modern sideshow. Stunts included bending iron bars in his teeth, surviving an electric chair, general strong-man/giant acts from 1999 to 2002. He appeared as a celebrity cook on the Christine Cushing cooking show, broadcast on the Food Network in 2002.

== Filmography ==
Actor
Year	Title	Role	Notes
1992	Are You Afraid of the Dark?	Goth	TV series (one episode: "The Tale of the Sorcerer's Apprentice")
1996	Carver's Gate	Demon #1 - The Big Demon	TV movie
2001	History Happened Here	Executioner	
2002	The New Sideshow	Stevan Hart, The Scandinavian Giant	TV documentary
2003	The Seán Cullen Show	Squatchie	TV series (six episodes)
2003	Dermott's Quest	The Warlock	Short film
2003	1-800-Missing	Demonic Scarecrow	TV series (one episode: "They Come as They Go")
2003	Chilly Beach	Grim Reaper	TV series (one episode: "Invasion of the Beer Snatchers")
2004	Wonderfalls	Satsuma Citizen	TV series (one episode: "Totem Mole")
2004	Resident Evil: Apocalypse	Featured City Hall Undead #5	
2005	The White Dog Sacrifice	Killer / Opening Narrator	
2005	Slings and Arrows	Giant Goth Guy	TV series (one episode: "Birnam Wood")
2006	Silent Hill	Elder	
2007	Animal 2	Inmate 2	
2007	Bakugan Battle Brawlers	Gorem	TV series
2007	Shoot 'Em Up	Club Bouncer	
2007	This Beautiful City	Charity Mover	
2008	The Jon Dore Show	Emcee	TV series (one episode: "Rage")
2008	20,000 Leagues Under the Sea	Captain Nemo	Short
2008	Fear Itself	Duane "Eater" Mellor	TV series (one episode: "Eater")
2008	Toronto Stories	Greely	
2008	Max Payne	Tattoo Artist Owner	
2009	You Might as Well Live	Homeless Man	
2009	Bakugan Battle Brawlers: New Vestroia	Gorem	TV series
2010	Ninety-one	Indian Chief	Short film
2010	Aaron Stone	Hockus Chokus	TV series (one episode: "Metal Gear Liquid")
2010	You Are Here	Gerald	
2010	Lost Girl	Tall Thin Man	TV series (one episode: "It's a Fae, Fae, Fae, Fae World")
2011	Bakugan: Mechtanium Surge	Vexfist	TV series
2011	Dave vs. Death	Grim Reaper	TV short
2013	Oz the Great and Powerful	Winkie General	
2013	Space Janitors	Dewey	TV series (one episode: "Life Debt")
2013	The Mortal Instruments: City of Bones	Brother Jeremiah	
2013	Enemy	Bouncer	
2016	Shadowhunters	Brother Jeremiah	TV series (nine episodes)
2016	What Would Sal Do	Crazy Man	TV series (one episode: "Sal Is Out")
2018	Channel Zero	Tall Boy	TV series (three episodes)
2018	12 Monkeys	Seer	TV series (one episode)
2020	The Hardy Boys	Tall Man	TV series (eight episodes)
