= Max Payne (video game) =

2001 third-person shooter video game

- Developer: Remedy Entertainment (Note: Ported to PlayStation 2 by Rockstar Canada, to Xbox by Neo Software, to Mac OS X by Westlake Interactive, and to iOS and Android by War Drum Studios. Game Boy Advance adaptation developed by Möbius Entertainment.)
- Publishers: Gathering of Developers (Windows); Rockstar Games (Note: Mac OS X version published by MacSoft in North America and Feral Interactive in Europe)
- Director: Petri Järvilehto
- Producers: George Broussard; Scott Miller
- Programmer: Markus Stein
- Writer: Sam Lake
- Composers: Kärtsy Hatakka; Kimmo Kajasto
- Series: Max Payne
- Platforms: Windows; PlayStation 2; Xbox; Mac OS X; Game Boy Advance; iOS; Android
- Release: 25 July 2001: Windows; NA/EU: 25 July 2001 PlayStation 2; NA: 11 December 2001; EU: 11 January 2002 Xbox; NA: 18 December 2001; EU: 14 March 2002 Mac OS X; WW: 16 July 2002 Game Boy Advance; NA: 16 December 2003; EU: 19 March 2004 iOS; WW: 12 April 2012 Android; WW: 14 June 2012
- Genre: Third-person shooter
- Mode: Single-player

Max Payne is a 2001 third-person shooter game developed by Remedy Entertainment. It was originally released for Windows by Gathering of Developers in July 2001. The game centers on former New York City Police Department (NYPD) detective Max Payne, who attempts to solve the murder of his family while investigating a mysterious new designer drug called "Valkyr". While doing so, Max becomes entangled in a large and complex conspiracy involving a major pharmaceutical company, organized crime, a secret society, and the United States Armed Forces. The game features a gritty neo-noir style and uses graphic novel panels with voice-overs as its primary means of storytelling, drawing inspiration from hard-boiled detective novels by authors like Mickey Spillane. It contains many allusions to Norse mythology, particularly the myth of Ragnarök and several names. The gameplay is heavily influenced by the Hong Kong action cinema genre, particularly the work of director John Woo, and it was one of the first games to feature the bullet time effect popularized by The Matrix (1999).

Max Payne was ported by Rockstar Canada to the PlayStation 2 and by Neo Software to Xbox in December 2001. The Mac OS X version was developed by Westlake Interactive and published in July 2002 by MacSoft in North America and by Feral Interactive in other regions. A version of the game for the Game Boy Advance, featuring an isometric perspective but retaining most of the original's gameplay elements, was developed by Möbius Entertainment and published by Rockstar Games in December 2003. An enhanced port for mobile devices was developed by War Drum Studios and published by Rockstar in 2012 to coincide with the release of Rockstar's Max Payne 3. A Dreamcast version of the game was also planned, but it was canceled due to the discontinuation of the console in 2001. Max Payne was released for the Xbox 360 in 2009 as part of the Xbox Originals program, the PlayStation 3 as a PlayStation 2 Classic in 2012, the PlayStation 4 in 2016, and the Xbox One and Xbox Series X/S in 2021, due to the consoles' backward compatibility and emulation features.

Max Payne received positive reviews from critics, and is often considered one of the greatest games ever made. Praise was directed at the game's exciting gunplay and use of noir storytelling devices, while some criticized its linear level design and short length. The game sold 4 million units. It won a large number of accolades, including a BAFTA Award for Best PC Game of 2001. Its success launched the Max Payne franchise, including the sequels Max Payne 2: The Fall of Max Payne, developed again by Remedy and published by Rockstar in October 2003, and Max Payne 3, developed solely by Rockstar and released in May 2012. A loose film adaptation of the first game was released in October 2008. In 2022, it was announced that Remedy is developing remakes of Max Payne and Max Payne 2 for PlayStation 5, Windows, and Xbox Series X/S, with Rockstar publishing.

== Gameplay ==
In-game screenshot depicting the use of bullet time

Max Payne is played from a third-person perspective, in which players assume the role of the game's titular character, navigating a variety of levels, in which the goal is mainly to survive, battle against various armed enemies, and reach a level's goal. The game's story is played out across three acts, each with a selection of levels that vary in environments, hazards and enemies and have a linear route that players must follow in from the start point in order to reach the goal. In some levels, the player must battle and defeat a boss character in order to complete the level.

Players initially begin each act in the game's story with one or two weapons on hand, but gain access to a variety of other weapons as they progress through each level, such as handguns, assault rifles, shotguns, and grenades, with Max Payne capable of dual wielding one-handed weapons for increased firepower at the expense of higher ammo consumption. Max's health is represented by a white figure on the HUD that slowly fills up red as he takes damage, where to replenish it, players must find and make use of painkillers scattered around the level or dropped by enemies. Alongside gun combat, players occasionally have to do some platforming and puzzle-solving in order to make progress in a level, with Max providing internal monologue that hint to players what they should be doing. At times, the game switches to a graphic novel-styled interlude in-between and during levels, in order to delve into the storyline, with the player able to revisit the novel to recall where they are in the story.

The game features two unique aspects of gameplay that impact how a player progresses in the game. The first is "bullet time", an ability that when triggered – either when standing or diving to dodge gunfire – slows down time for a brief period. Although Max and enemies will move slowly whilst active, players will be able to react to enemy gunfire quickly, while being provided more precise firefighting control in battles. Bullet time is represented by an hourglass next to Max's health bar, which depletes when the ability is being used, and can only be replenished by killing enemies. The second aspect is the game's AI - while enemy behavior is scripted (such as taking cover, retreating from the player, or throwing grenades), the game's default difficulty, "Fugitive", is modified by the AI based on the player's performance in a level through each of its areas. If a player is doing well, the AI modifies the next area of the level to feature more enemies and fewer item pickups; if the player is doing poorly, more pickups are provided and enemies made less threatening.

The game story features several other difficulties levels: "Hard-Boiled", which increases damage taken while limiting health and ammo supplies; "Dead on Arrival", which limits the player to only seven saves per chapter; and "New York Minute", which forces the player to complete each chapter within an allotted time. Upon completing the game on "Dead on Arrival", the player unlocks "The Last Challenge" (also known as "End Combat" or "Final Battle" in other releases), which gives the player a select amount of painkillers, weapons, and ammunition, and puts them in a firefight with perpetual bullet time against the "Killer Suit" hitmen seen during the later parts of the game's campaign.

== Plot ==
Graphic novel panels are used in place of cutscenes as narration, an element common to the neo-noir genre.

Max Payne (James McCaffrey) is a former NYPD officer-turned-DEA agent whose wife Michelle (Haviland Morris) and newborn daughter Rose were murdered by armed junkies that were high on a new designer drug called Valkyr. In 2001, three years after their deaths, Max works undercover within the Punchinello Crime Family, who control the trafficking of Valkyr. His DEA colleague, B.B. (Adam Grupper), arranges a meeting between Max and his friend and former colleague, Alex Balder (Chris Phillips), in a subway station. While waiting for Alex, Max accidentally gets in a shootout with mobsters working for Punchinello underboss Jack Lupino (Jeff Gurner), who are staging a bank robbery through an abandoned part of the subway. When Alex arrives, he is killed by an unseen assassin, who frames Max for the murder.

Hunted by both the police and his former mob associates, who now know he is a cop, Max searches for Vinnie Gognitti (Joe Dallo), Lupino's right-hand man, in New York City's underworld in the hopes that he will lead him to Lupino. Along the way, he breaks up a Valkyr drug deal and discovers that Russian mobster Vladimir Lem (Dominic Hawksley) has started a war with the Punchinello family. After catching Gognitti, Max interrogates him and learns Lupino is at his nightclub. Max kills Lupino before running into Mona Sax (Julia Murney), a contract assassin and the sister-in-law of Don Angelo Punchinello (Joe Ragno). Mona, seeking revenge against Punchinello for abusing her sister and not wanting Max to get in her way, gives him a drink laced with Valkyr. While experiencing a nightmare of the night his family was killed, Max is found by mobsters and taken away to be tortured, but manages to escape.

Max strikes a partnership with Lem, who gives him a tip about a cargo ship at the Brooklyn waterfront carrying high-powered firearms, which some of Lem's former henchmen intend to sell to Punchinello. After securing the weapons, Max attempts to lure the Don into a trap at his restaurant, only to be ambushed himself. After escaping, Max storms Punchinello's manor and confronts the Don, but discovers that he is only a puppet in a bigger conspiracy. The manor is then overrun by mercenaries who kill Punchinello and leave Max for dead after injecting him with a Valkyr overdose.

After another drug-induced nightmare, Max heads to an old steel foundry where the mercenaries are regrouping. There, he finds a hidden underground military research complex, and discovers that Valkyr is the result of the "Valhalla Project", a Gulf War-era military experiment to improve soldiers' stamina and morale through chemical enhancements. The project was halted after a few years due to poor results, but was later secretly restarted by Nicole Horne (Jane Gennaro) through her pharmaceutical company, Aesir. When Michelle accidentally found out about Aesir's illegal experiments, Horne ordered her and her family's deaths. Max escapes from the bunker after Aesir initiates a self-destruct protocol to get rid of the evidence and witnesses, including their own men.

Max, having figured out that B.B. is on Horne's payroll and framed him for Alex's murder, agrees to meet him at a parking lot complex, where he kills him and his men. Max is then called to meet a secret society called the Inner Circle, who have been observing him. Their leader, Alfred Woden (John Randolph Jones), reveals that Horne was once a member, and asks Max to kill her in exchange for dealing with the charges against him. The meeting is ambushed by Horne's men, but both Max and Woden escape. Max arrives at Aesir's headquarters and fights his way to the top. Along the way, he runs into Mona again, who has been hired by Horne to kill him; she refuses to do so and is seemingly killed for it, but her body vanishes. As Horne attempts to flee in her helicopter, Max severs the guy wires of the building's antenna, causing it to crash into the helicopter and kill Horne. As the NYPD storms the building, Max surrenders and is taken into custody. Outside, he notices Woden among the crowd formed at the scene and smiles, knowing that Woden will ensure his protection.

== Characters ==
Max Payne

Max Payne (voiced by James McCaffrey) is a fugitive DEA agent and former NYPD detective whose wife Michelle and newborn daughter were killed in connection with the Valkyr drug case. Max then goes undercover in the mob and eventually becomes a one-man-army vigilante, waging a personal war on crime. Max ends up killing hundreds of gangsters and conspiracy enforcers while on the run from the police determined to stop his vendetta against all those responsible for his family's death. He uses metaphors and wordplay to describe the world around him within his inner monologues, which often contradict his external responses to characters he speaks with. The game presents the story as retold by Max from his point of view.

Mona Sax

Mona Sax (voiced by Julia Murney): The twin sister of Lisa Punchinello and a contract killer, Mona is the femme fatale of the game. She has a grudge against her sister Lisa's abusive husband, mafia boss Angelo Punchinello, whom she desires to kill. After Punchinello is killed, she sides with Nicole Horne, who hires her to kill Max. Finding herself unable to do so, she is shot in the head by one of Horne's henchmen and collapses inside an elevator, though it is implied that she survived, as her body is gone when the elevator's doors reopen.

== Development ==
Remedy Entertainment developed an idea of a "third-person action game" in late 1996, after completing Death Rally (their first game), inspired first by Loaded and then by the success of Tomb Raider (although determined to avoid its "horrid camera system"). According to the game's story and scriptwriter Sam Lake, for him "the starting point was this archetype of the private eye, the hard-boiled cop" that would be used in a game with a "deeper, more psychological" story. A game prototype and design document of the project, with the working titles Dark Justice and Max Heat (a wordplay on this is a TV show called Dick Justice and a porn film Max Heat, both featured in Max Payne 2), were soon created and shown to 3D Realms, who signed a development deal and production began. In 1999, the designers traveled from Finland to New York to research the city, accompanied by two ex-NYPD bodyguards, to get ideas for environments and take thousands of photographs for mapping.

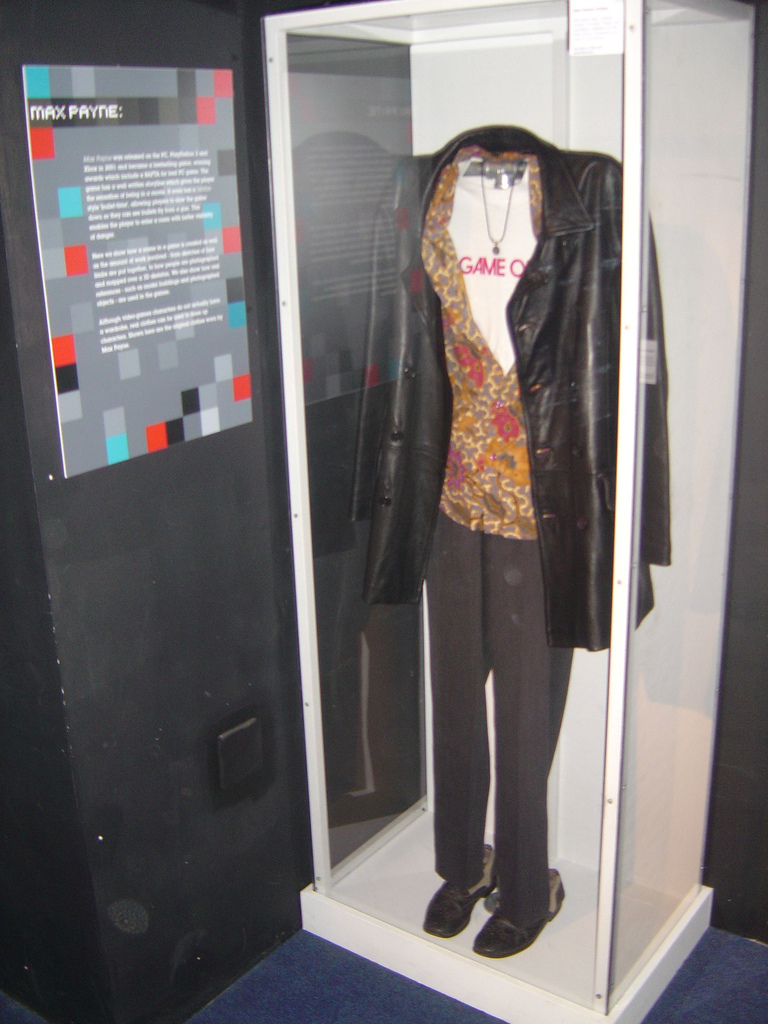
Max Payne's in-game outfit on display at the Game On exhibition at the Science Museum in London, England

For cutscenes, the developers found comic panels (with voice-overs) to be more effective and less costly to use than fully animated cinematics, noting that comic panels forced the player to interpret each panel for themselves and "the nuances are there in the head of the reader [...] it would be much harder to reach that level with in-game or even pre-rendered cinematics". They also found it easier to reorganize the comic panels if the plot needed to be changed while developing the game. The in-game engine is used for some cutscenes involving action sequences. The music for the game was composed by Kärtsy Hatakka.

Remedy used its own in-house engine, MAX-FX, which had been in development since early 1997. The engine was used in Max Payne and its sequel, and the level editor was shipped with both games for use by players. MAX-FX was licensed to Futuremark, who used it for their 3DMark benchmark series with the last one being 3DMark 2001 Second Edition.

The first trailer showcasing an early version of the game's story and gameplay was shown at the 1998 E3, attracting considerable interest due to its innovative content and effects (especially the MaxFX's 3D particle-based system for smoke and muzzle flashes), although 3D Realms producers later claimed they deliberately avoided overhyping the game. Max Payne was initially scheduled to be released in the spring of 1999; however, it was repeatedly delayed and got heavily revamped in 2000. In particular, the game's graphics were improved to feature much more realistic textures and lighting, while the multiplayer mode was dropped. The game was released for Windows on 25 July 2001. The intended release was on Monday, 23 July 2001 but an error on the customs form for the shipment from the production facility in Canada caused FedEx to ship the game copies to Memphis, Tennessee, instead of Dallas, such that a trucking company had to be hired to bring them to their intended destination for worldwide shipment.

As a result of the inevitable comparisons to The Matrix, the designers have included several homages to the film in order to capitalize on the hype: for instance, the detonation of the subway tunnel door to gain access to the bank vault is similar to the cartwheeling elevator door in the movie, while the introduction "Nothing to Lose" level is similar to the lobby shootout scene in the film. Futuremark, which licensed the MAX-FX graphics for their 3DMark benchmark series, included a Matrix-like lobby shootout as a game test in the 2001 edition.

=== Game Boy Advance version ===
The Game Boy Advance port of Max Payne received praise for its voice acting, a feature that was rare among GBA titles.

Released on 16 December 2003, the GBA version of the game was developed in 2003 by Möbius Entertainment (later Rockstar Leeds). Since it was developed on a far less powerful platform, this version differs significantly from the PC versions and its Xbox and PlayStation 2 ports: instead of a 3D shooter, the game is based on sprite graphics and is shown from an isometric perspective. However, the other gameplay features have remained very similar to the original, including the use of polygonal graphics for the characters. The story also remained the same as in the PC and console versions, though some levels from the original are omitted, and the game still features many of the original's graphic novel sections, complete with some of the voice-overs. The music was composed by Tom Kingsley.

=== Max Payne Mobile ===
On 6 April 2012, Max Payne was announced for Android and iOS, titled Max Payne Mobile, a port of the PC version of the original Max Payne. The game was released for iOS on 13 April 2012, while the Android version was delayed until 14 June 2012. No major changes were made to the game apart from the HD overhaul. A new version 1.3 was released on 18 March 2013 that fixes a bug that prevents users from accessing their cloud saves. This version of the game was the first time the game was released in Germany, after the ban of it was lifted. It was only released in a censored state.

== Reception ==
=== Critical reception ===
Reception

Aggregate score
Aggregator	Score
Metacritic	PC: 89/100; PS2: 80/100; XBOX: 89/100; GBA: 78/100 iOS: 75/100

Review scores
Publication	Score
AllGame	PC: 4.5/5; PS2: 3.5/5; XBOX: 4/5
Edge	6/10
GamePro	4.5/5
GameSpot	9.2/10
GameZone	9.2/10
IGN	9.5/10
Next Generation	4/5
TouchArcade	iOS: 5/5

Awards
Publication	Award
BAFTA	Best PC Game of 2001
IGN	Readers Choice Action Game of the Year, 2001 Readers' Choice Best Story, Best Graphics, Best Sound
GameSpot	Best of E3 2000, The Top Games of E3 2001, Readers' Choice Game of 2001, Readers' Choice Single-Player Action Game of 2001, two 2001 Game of the Year nominations

Max Payne was released to positive reviews. AllGame praised the game's atmosphere, level and sound design while stating that the "story is, at times, predictable and full of clichés" and that "Unlike Half-Life, where the action is integrated perfectly with its simplistic, yet appropriate story, Max Payne frequently yanks you out of the game and forces you to look at a badly-drawn in-game 'graphic novel' and listen to mediocre dialogue." The review also noted a lack of replay value or multiplayer modes. In a mixed review, Edge praised Max Payne for successfully integrating the bullet time mechanic into its core but criticized its linear and shallow level design. The graphics were generally praised for high-resolution textures which made the game environment look very realistic, with minor criticism for the character models which lacked animated facial expressions (IGN criticized the titular character's "grimace on his face that makes him look constipated").

The PlayStation 2 version suffered from reduced detail and occasional slowdowns, as the game stressed the limits of the console's power. Also, the levels were broken up into smaller parts so it would not tax the PlayStation 2's 32 MB of RAM, which according to IGN caused "heavy disruption to the flow and tension of the story". Otherwise, it was a faithful port that retained all of the content from the PC original. GameSpot awarded it an 8.0/10, (compared to the 9.2 ratings awarded to the PC and Xbox versions), saying "If you can't play this intense, original action game on any platform except the PS2, then that's where you should play it--but only by default."

Jeff Lundrigan reviewed the PC version of the game for Next Generation, rating it four stars out of five, and stated that "Max Payne is not perfect. On the other hand, we can think of few games, ever, that were such a blast to play, so neatly captured the essence of what they set out to simulate, or were just so over-the-top cool."

Max Payne Mobile received generally positive reviews. Appolicious praised the HD graphics overhaul, although it pointed out the game's age and the issues with the touchscreen controls.

=== Sales ===
In the United States, in its debut month, Max Payne sold roughly 82,000 units. In the US, it was the 19th best-selling computer game of 2001, with domestic sales of 300,782 units and revenues of $13.8 million. In the US, the game's PC and PlayStation 2 versions respectively sold 430,000 units ($16.9 million in revenue) and 1.6 million units ($56 million in revenue) by 2006. According to Edge and Next Generation, this made Max Payne the country's 33rd highest-selling computer game released between 2000 and 2006, and the 26th highest-selling game launched for the PlayStation 2, Xbox or GameCube between those dates.

In the United Kingdom, the Entertainment and Leisure Software Publishers Association (ELSPA) awarded Max Payne's computer version a "Silver" sales award, and its PlayStation 2 version a "Gold" award, indicating respective sales of at least 100,000 and 200,000 units in the country.

Max Payne ultimately sold 4 million units. (Note: other sources say more than 5 million copies by 2005)

=== Accolades ===
The game won many annual awards for the year 2001, including Best PC Game by the British Academy of Film and Television Arts; Golden Joystick Award by Dennis Publishing; Visitors Award Best PC Game at the European Computer Trade Show; Best Game of 2001, Best Graphics in a PC Game, and Best PC Action Game by The Electric Playground; Readers Choice Best Game and Best PC Game by Pelit; Computer Game of the Year by The Augusta Chronicle; Best PC Game of 2001 by Amazon.com; PC Game of the Year by Shacknews and by GameZone; The Best of 2001 - PC and Editor's Choice by Game Revolution; Reader's Choice Game, Best Single Player Action Game, and Best Xbox Game by GameSpot; Readers' Choice Game of the Year, Best Storyline, Best Graphics and Best Use of Sound, and Best Adventure Game (Xbox) and Editor's Choice by IGN; Gamers Choice Award (Xbox) by Games Domain; Best Gimmick by GameSpy (runner-up in the Best Ingame Cinematics and Best Movie Trailer categories); and Editor's Choice and Best Innovation Destined for Overuse by Computer Gaming World. The staff of IGN wrote: "This game garnered so many votes from the readers that we almost decided to create a new Best Max Payne Game of 2001 category." The site also called it the 96th best PlayStation 2 game. They claimed that gamers thought of Max Payne instead of The Matrix when they thought of bullet time. PC Gamer US presented Max Payne with its 2001 "Best Action Game" and "Best Graphics" awards and the editors summarized the game as "spine-chilling, exhilarating, and surreal". GameSpot named Max Payne's Xbox version the sixth-best console game of 2001. It was a runner-up in the publication's annual "Best Xbox Game" and, among console games, "Best Story" and "Best Shooting Game" award categories.

An early version of Max Payne was also a runner-up for the Best of Show award at E3 in 1998. The finished game received several Game of the Month-type awards in various video game outlets (and a Seal of Excellence at Adrenaline Vault) and was included in the 2005 list of 50 best games of all time, as well as in the 2011 list of 100 top PC games of all time. In 2007, Bit-Tech included the game and its sequel on the list of the top five most moddable games. It received two awards from Eurogamer, Best Game Cinematography Award and Best Game Character Award of 2001.

== Legacy ==
A sequel, Max Payne 2: The Fall of Max Payne, was released in 2003. The third game, Max Payne 3, was developed by Rockstar Games and released in 2012. Max Payne, a film loosely based on the video game, was released in 2008, starring Mark Wahlberg as Max Payne and Mila Kunis as Mona Sax. In April 2022, Remedy announced that it is remaking Max Payne and Max Payne 2 with funding from Rockstar, using Remedy's Northlight Engine, to be released as a compilation for PlayStation 5, Windows, and Xbox Series X/S.
