= Joel Gordon =

Canadian actor and producer

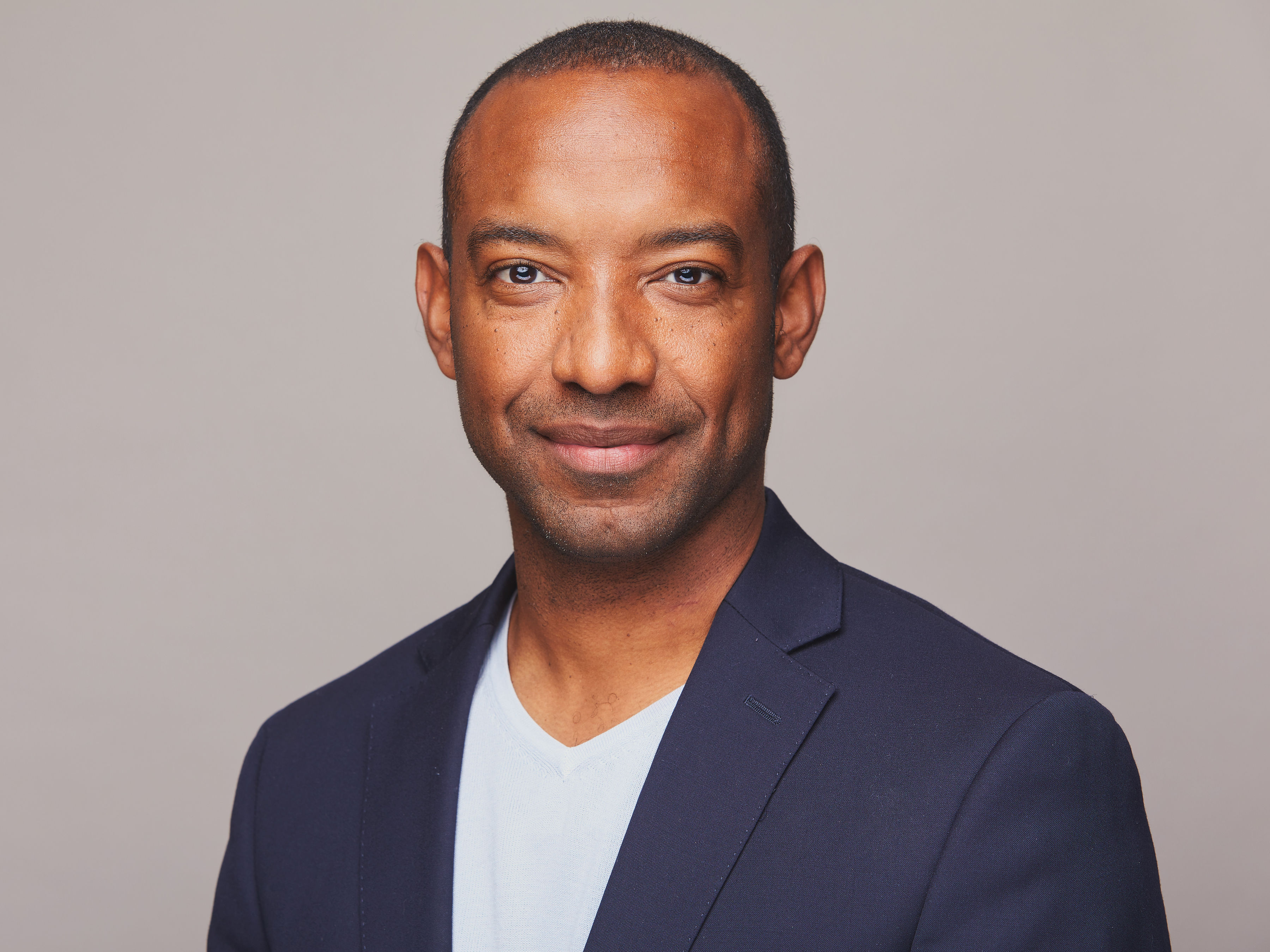
- Born: November 15, 1975 (age 50); Toronto, Ontario, Canada
- Occupations: Actor, producer, director
- Years active: 1989–present
- Spouse: Erin Gordon (m. 2004)
- Children: 4
- Website: www.vformation.tv

Joel Gordon (born November 15, 1975) is a Canadian actor, producer and director.

== Early life ==
As a teenager growing up in Scarborough, Toronto, Joel Gordon received the Harry Jerome Award for the Arts for his work as a young actor. After studying acting at York University, Gordon made his professional stage debut as an actor in George F. Walker's play Heaven, and appeared on the front cover of Eye Weekly on June 4, 2002, for his role as Romeo in Romeo/Juliet Remixed.

== Career ==
Gordon's first movie appearance as an actor was in Rude, which was screened at Cannes.

In 2008, Gordon appeared in Max Payne as the character Owen Green. Also in 2008, Gordon produced and directed the award-winning television documentary Embracing da Kink, which won the 2008 Golden Sheaf Award for best Documentary in the Arts/Culture category at the Yorkton Film Festival.

Gordon's work as a television producer has earned three Gemini nominations from the Academy of Canadian Cinema and Television.

CBC Television aired "Wrestling with Destiny" in March 2004, which Gordon produced and directed. It chronicles the life of Olympic and World Wrestling Champion, Daniel Igali. "Wrestling with Destiny" won five Leo Awards including Best Sports Program or Series.

One of Gordon's most notable television biographies was a 48-minute documentary on Margaret Atwood entitled Turning Pages: The Life and Literature of Margaret Atwood.

In 2012, he co-created and started production on Love is Moving, a TV series that aired on NRB Network and on Global Television Network in 2013. The television series follows young people who participate in the Love Movement curriculum and then put love into action in their communities.

=== Work outside of film and television ===
Along with Benjamin Porter in 2010, Gordon co-founded Love Movement, which is a Christian organization, movement and curriculum that promotes a greater understanding of love and how it can be applied through loving God, and loving others. The first national partner to join Love Movement in shaping the curriculum is World Vision Canada. The official launch date for Love Movement was February 14, 2012.

== Filmography ==
=== Acting ===
Year	Title	Role	Genre
2008	Max Payne	Owen Green	Movie
2008	The Line	Rev. Reese	TV series
2004	This is Wonderland	Darwin	TV series
2001	Danger Beneath the Sea	Terry Peel	TV movie
1999	Animorphs	Hugo	TV series
1998	Down in the Delta	Jesse	Movie
1998	Blind Faith	David Mercer	Movie
1998	My Date with the President's Daughter	Curtis	TV movie
1993	Are You Afraid of the Dark?	Billy	TV series

=== TV producing and directing ===
Year	Title	Role	Genre	Awards
2013	Love Is Moving	Co-executive producer, producer	TV series	
2008	Embracing da Kink	Executive producer, director	TV documentary	Winner 2008 Golden Sheaf Award, 2008 Gemini Nominee
2007	Turning Pages: The Life and Literature of Margaret Atwood	Producer, director	TV documentary	
2006	Leading Man: The Life and Times of William Hutt	Producer, director	TV documentary	Nomination 2007 Gemini Award
2004	Wrestling with Destiny: The Life and Times of Daniel Igali	Producer, director	TV documentary	Winner 2005 Leo Awards, Nomination 2004 Gemini Award
2002	Superbob	Director	Movie	Winner 2002 Star! ReelChoice Audience Award,
