= Newcity =

Newspaper and media company in Chicago, Illinois

- Type: Alternative weekly (1988–2017); Free monthly (2017–present)
- Format: online cultural
- Owner(s): Newcity Communications, Inc.
- Publisher: Brian Hieggelke; Jan Hieggelke
- Editor: Brian Hieggelke
- Associate Publisher: Mike Hartnett
- Founded: 1988; 38 years ago
- Headquarters: 47 West Polk Street; Chicago
- Circulation: 70,000 (2000-2010)
- Website: newcity.com

Newcity (sometimes styled NewCity) is a media company based in Chicago. Formerly publishers of a free, weekly alternative newspaper, the company now publishes a glossy monthly free magazine using the same Newcity name. Newcity also owns and manages the Chicago Film Project, a production company dedicated to telling artistic stories centered on Chicago.

== Publication history ==
Newcity the company was founded in 1986 by married couple Brian and Jan Hieggelke. Brian Hieggelke had earlier graduated from the University of Chicago Booth School of Business, and "many of Newcity’s writers, designers and interns graduated from" the University of Chicago.

Newcity's first publication was a neighborhood newspaper. In 1988, the Hieggelke's began publishing Newcity as a free, weekly alternative newspaper.

Between 2000 and 2010, Newcity reported its newspaper circulation within Chicago to be about 70,000 per week.

From 2003 to 2013, Newcity helped finance the relaunch of the University of Chicago student newspaper the Chicago Weekly (formerly called the Chicago Weekly News). Under the partnership, a copy of Newcity came inserted in the middle of each Chicago Weekly issue. In 2013, the Chicago Weekly changed its name to the South Side Weekly and began publishing independently of Newcity.

In March 2017, the Hieggelkes transformed the newspaper into a glossy monthly free magazine, using the same Newcity name.

In March 2018, Newcity branched out as a website developer and creator of custom publications.

== Content ==
Newcity specializes in coverage of Chicago's music, stage, film, and art scenes, and is notable for launching the careers of numerous cartoonists, writers, and art critics. A popular issue is its Best of Chicago feature, in which writers assign the best and worst of Chicago culture and politics.

The publication was described by the Chicago Tribune in 1995 as "sophisticated" and as an "alternative weekly" which was a niche publication in the digital space in 2005.

Newcity covered issues such as traffic congestion; for example, a 2010 editorial called for the city to value walkers as much as drivers.

Newcity's senior editors included Tom Lynch as well as writer Nate Lee. Newcity also publishes writers including Michael Nagrant who also writes for The Huffington Post. It also had movie reviews by critic and photographer Ray Pride.

== Comics ==
Newcity was one of the first publications to publish the work of cartoonist Chris Ware, with Ware works like Jimmy Corrigan, the Smartest Kid on Earth being serialized in its pages before appearing in Ware's comics series Acme Novelty Library and eventual publication as a graphic novel. Newcity also published comics by Ivan Brunetti, the combo of writer Harvey Pekar and illustrator Tara Seibel, Jeffrey Brown, and non-fiction graphic journalism by Patrick W. Welch and Carrie Golus.

== Chicago Film Project ==
In 2019, the Hieggelkes began the Chicago Film Project, "which is dedicated to telling artistic stories centered in Chicago." The company's first film, Signature Move, "premiered at the 2017 South by Southwest festival and played at more than 150 other festivals worldwide." Its second movie, Knives and Skin, premiered December 2019 at the Berlin International Film Festival.

=== Films produced ===
- Signature Move (2017), directed by Jennifer Reeder
- Knives and Skin, (2019), directed by Jennifer Reeder
- Dreaming Grand Avenue (2020), directed by Hugh Schulze
- Relative (2022), written and directed by Michael Glover Smith
