= Perpetrator (film) =

2023 film by Jennifer Reeder

- Release poster
- Directed by: Jennifer Reeder
- Written by: Jennifer Reeder
- Produced by: Derek Bishé; Gregory Chambet
- Starring: Kiah McKirnan; Melanie Liburd; Ireon Roach; Casimere Jollette; Tim Hopper; Josh Bywater; Chris Lowell; Alicia Silverstone
- Cinematography: Sevdije Kastrati
- Edited by: Justin Krohn
- Music by: Nick Zinner
- Production companies: 30West; WTFilms; Divide/Conquer
- Distributed by: Shudder
- Release dates: February 17, 2023 (Berlinale); September 1, 2023
- Running time: 101 minutes
- Countries: United States; France
- Language: English

Perpetrator is a 2023 psychological supernatural body horror written and directed by Jennifer Reeder. It stars Kiah McKirnan, Melanie Liburd, Ireon Roach, Casimere Jollette, Tim Hopper, Josh Bywater, Chris Lowell and Alicia Silverstone. The film follows Jonny, an impulsive teenage girl living in a town where young women continue to go missing.

It was nominated to compete for the Panorama Audience Award at the 73rd Berlin International Film Festival, where it had its world premiere on February 17, 2023. The film was released on the streaming service Shudder on September 1, 2023.

== Cast ==
- Kiah McKirnan as Jonquil "Jonny" Baptiste
- Melanie Liburd as Jean Baptiste
- Ireon Roach as Elektra
- Casimere Jollette as Aviva
- Tim Hopper as Gene Baptiste
- Josh Bywater as Officer Sterling
- Audrey Francis as Marcy
- Christopher Lowell as Principal Burke
- Alicia Silverstone as Hildie Baptiste
- Sasha Kuznetsov as Kirk
- Ilirida Memedovski as Avalon
- Greta Stolte as Darby

== Production ==
Jennifer Reeder's second feature to screen at Berlinale, following 2019's Knives and Skin, is produced by newly turned producers, Paris-based sales agent WTFilms. It also marks her third collaboration with Shudder, since 2021 anthology film V/H/S/94 and 2022 film Night’s End. Reeder and her crew shot Perpetrator in Chicago during March 2022, which she described as "a miserable time to shoot a film, but we got beautiful footage."

== Release ==
Perpetrator had its premiere at the 73rd Berlin International Film Festival on February 17, 2023. It was reported in December 2022, that Shudder had acquired the distribution rights. It was invited to Horizons section of 57th Karlovy Vary International Film Festival, where it was screened on June 30, 2023. The film was selected for Festival She Makes Noise 2023, where it was screened on October 20 (Spanish Premiere).

The film was released on September 1, 2023.

== Reception ==
On the review aggregator website Rotten Tomatoes, 80% of 61 critics' reviews are positive, with an average rating of 6.5/10. The website's consensus reads: "A smartly ambitious supernatural thriller, Perpetrator blends an assortment of genres and influences into a bloody good time." Metacritic, which uses a weighted average, assigned the film a score of 66 out of 100, based on 15 critics, indicating "generally favorable" reviews.

Jessica Kiang reviewing at Berlin Film Festival, for Variety wrote, "The tonal uncertainty is hardly helped by an arch performance style that too often strays closer to play-acting than acting — an impression enhanced by the disparity in age between much of the principal cast and the teenagers they’re playing." Jude Dry reviewing for IndieWire graded the film B− and wrote, that the film "suffers from a novice lead performance and a script that tries to do too much." Dry praising Silverstone stated, "she is a steely delight as the sharp-tongued and demanding mystery lady." Concluding she said, "There are satisfying genre elements, to be sure, Perpetrator cannot be accused of playing it safe."

== Accolades ==
Award	Date	Category	Recipient	Result	Ref.
Berlin International Film Festival	February 26, 2023	Panorama Audience Award for Best Feature Film	Perpetrator	Nominated	
Teddy Award	February 26, 2023	Best Feature Film	Perpetrator	Nominated	
