= Return of the Living Dead (upcoming film) =

Unfinished film by Steve Wolsh

- Directed by: Steve Wolsh
- Written by: Steve Wolsh
- Produced by: Mason Novick; Ted Field
- Starring: Devon Sawa; Casimere Jollette; Kynlee Heiman; Alexander Ward; Johnny Knoxville; Ruby Snowber; Blake Richardson; Doug Jones; Sean Gunn
- Production company: MayDay Movie Productions
- Distributed by: WithAnO Productions
- Country: United States
- Language: English

Return of the Living Dead is an in-development American horror film, serving as an installment in the Return of the Living Dead franchise, and a direct sequel to The Return of the Living Dead (1985), set after the events of the first film. Written and directed by Steve Wolsh, the film stars Devon Sawa, Casimere Jollette, Kynlee Heiman, and Alexander Ward. The current status of the film is unknown after an August 2026 ruling in Los Angeles Superior Court found that Living Dead Media does not possess rights to film and production or the official chain of title for the 1985 movie, residing with Metro-Goldwyn-Mayer, and that Living Dead Media's 2017 application for motion picture production services was refused and ultimately abandoned in 2018.

== Cast ==
- Devon Sawa as Issac Horton
- Casimere Jollette as Delilah Horton
- Kynlee Heiman as Sofia Horton
- Alexander Ward as Tarman
- Johnny Knoxville
- Ruby Snowber
- Blake Richardson
- Doug Jones
- Sean Gunn

== Production ==
In December 2024, Living Dead Media revealed a teaser trailer announcing the development of a direct sequel to the 1985 film The Return of the Living Dead, simply titled Return of the Living Dead; filmmakers attached include Living Dead Media's CEO Steve Wolsh as writer and director, Christopher W. Fox (son of original Return producer Tom Fox) as executive producer, and Tony Gardener as makeup effects designer. Additionally, the film's teaser and production is committed to not use computer-generated elements or green-screen, opting to use practical effects and shoot on location. Due to a rights lawsuit prior to development, the film would not contain characters from the previous installment, with the exception of the "Tarman" zombie. In October of that year, Devon Sawa, Casimere Jollette, Kynlee Heiman, and Alexander Ward were announced as part of the cast. In November 2026, Johnny Knoxville, Ruby Snowber, Blake Richardson, Doug Jones, and Sean Gunn joined the cast.

=== Filming ===
Filming occurred for an undisclosed period throughout 2025 before being put on pause, and would continue into 2026.

== Release ==
Return of the Living Dead is currently undated. It was originally aiming to release in December 2025, but was delayed to November 2026 due to the filming taking longer than expected. It would miss its November 2026 release due to a lawsuit. An event was held in the London West Hollywood at Beverly Hills in December 2025, for various film industry workers, where a thirteen-minute scene of the film was exclusively shown.

== Lawsuit ==
In August 2026, a ruling in Los Angeles Superior Court found that the official chain of title for the 1985 movie resides with Metro-Goldwyn-Mayer and that Living Dead Media's 2017 application for motion picture production services was refused and ultimately abandoned in 2018. The court did note that Living Dead Media does possess registered rights "covering certain ancillary merchandise, including cosmetics, beverages, and costumes" but nothing in regard to film rights and production.
