= Nate Lee =

Nate Lee may refer to:

- Nate Lee (author), American author
- Nate Lee (footballer), Guamanian footballer

== See also ==
- Nathaniel Lee, English dramatist
- Nathan Lee, Korean-American pianist
