= Malignant (soundtrack) =

Malignant (Original Motion Picture Soundtrack)

Film score by Joseph Bishara
- Released: September 3, 2021
- Recorded: 2020–2021
- Genre: Film score
- Length: 53:49
- Label: WaterTower Music
- Producer: Joseph Bishara

Joseph Bishara chronology
The Conjuring: The Devil Made Me Do It (2021)	Malignant (2021)	The Free Fall (2022)

Malignant (Original Motion Picture Soundtrack) is the film score composed by Joseph Bishara to the 2021 supernatural horror film Malignant, directed by James Wan. The film score was released through WaterTower Music on September 3, 2021.

== Development ==
Frequent James Wan collaborator Joseph Bishara, who had worked on the director in numerous films, including the Insidious and The Conjuring film series, was confirmed to score Malignant in April 2021. He was involved even before the production began where he and Wan discussed about the script overnight. He also acknowledged on the polarized response for the film, adding that the film might not be for everyone, but works well for the people who enter into the world. Bishara had developed on a "weird jazz ensemble" kind-of voicing that used the doubling of viola and saxophone, and doubling of violin and trumpet, with a drum kit holding together, and referenced giallo films for the soundscape. He had also discussed with Wan and music supervisor Michelle Silverman on using the specific soundscape based on Wan's ideas. The opening sequence was soundtrack with Celldweller's "When Your Walls Fall (Faction 15)" which Silverman provided.

The production of the score emphasizes three recording sessions. The first session being the "character session" that emphasizes on drums, viola, saxophone, violin and trumpet. The second was a group session which was described as "string wall"; in this session, eighteen string players were split into two rows with nine in each. Players from one row would run towards one direction on the side, while the other row runs into the opposite direction on the other side. Bishara used to hear things in configuration of players in the room, with the writing was a response to the material. At the later stage, another traditional string group recorded with one clarinet, French horn and piano. During the action scenes, the score transitioned to an electronic, beat-driven sound which was Wan's suggestion. He referenced it as a throwback to giallo films, where Wan had learnt more of the electronic influence from the films, which was a response to the jazz-flavored influence. Bishara further used female vocals, as it tied into the lead character in the film. Kirsten Ashley Weist, a soprano female vocalist performed the vocals.

== Release ==
The score was released under the WaterTower Music label on September 3, 2021, a week prior to the film's release. Waxwork Records further released the album into a 180-gram blood red with gold blade and cold blue splattered vinyl LP, that was packaged into a gate-fold jacket with satin coating with an original artwork, which Bishara liked it.

== Track listing ==
No.	Title	Length
1.	"Malignant Opening"	1:05
2.	"Time To Cut"	2:54
3.	"Head Injury"	3:27
4.	"Twisted Figure"	2:32
5.	"Something Special"	1:10
6.	"Loss Without Memory"	1:46
7.	"Repeat Visit"	2:30
8.	"In My House"	2:52
9.	"Blood Connection"	2:15
10.	"What Has Become"	2:29
11.	"Discovery Was Made"	1:36
12.	"From Window Led"	4:09
13.	"By Silvercup"	1:31
14.	"Gabriel Calls"	2:25
15.	"Forced Vision"	1:46
16.	"Balcony Drops"	2:48
17.	"It's Happened Before"	2:42
18.	"Fallen Found"	1:29
19.	"Call From The Devil"	1:58
20.	"Station Taken"	3:29
21.	"Backwards Arrival"	3:17
22.	"Taking It Back"	2:04
23.	"Lifetime Found"	1:35
Total length:		53:49

== Reception ==
Andrew Barker of Variety wrote "Joseph Bishara's score nods to sources as varied as Bernard Herrmann and the Pixies". Bhuvanesh Chandar of Cinema Express wrote "great use of music by Joseph Bishara, Wan's frequent collaborator". Chris Evangelista of /Film wrote "Joseph Bishara's wacko film score blasts in your ears." Robert Kojder of Flickering Myth described it as "a bombastic and cheesy score from Joseph Bishara". Jack Pooley of WhatCulture "Bishara's score is laudably diverse, at times amping-up the orchestral swell for the campier horror-show set-pieces, but also including a strong electronic foundation, as on occasion feels like a nod to the giallo genre." Johanan Prime of Hype wrote "Joseph Bishara's synthetic riff of the classic Pixie's song "Where Is My Mind" in "Malignant" can be a perfect summation of this movie."

== Personnel ==
Credits adapted from WaterTower Music:

- Music composed and produced by – Joseph Bishara
- Recording – Chris Spilfogel, Fernando Morales Franchini
- Mixing – Chris Spilfogel
- Mastering – Dave Collins
- Music coordinator – Jen O'Malley
- Copyist – Eric Stonerook Music
- Executive in charge of music for New Line Cinema – Erin Scully
- Executive in charge of WaterTower Music – Jason Linn
- Music business affairs executives – Ari Taitz, Cara Adams
- Production Manager for WaterTower Music – Sandeep Sriram

Orchestra

- Orchestra – The Hollywood Studio Symphony
- Orchestration – Dana Niu
- Orchestra contractor – Encompass Music Partners
- Concertmaster – Daphne Chen

Instruments

- Bass – Geoffrey Osika, Michael Valerio, Stephanie Payne, Stephen Dress
- Cello – Armen Ksajikian, Timothy Loo, Vanessa Freebairn-Smith, Richard Dodd
- Clarinet – Phil O'Connor
- Drums – Christian Euman
- French horn – Andrew Bain
- Piano – Vicki Ray
- Saxophone – Bob Reynolds
- Trumpet – Wayne Bergeron
- Viola – Aaron Oltman, Alma Fernandez, Corinne Olsen, Lauren Baba, Leah Katz
- Violin – Charlie Bisharat, Eliza James Chorley, Ina Veli, Katie Sloan, Marisa Kuney, Tereza Stanislav, Eric Gorfain

== Release history ==
Release history and formats for Malignant (Original Motion Picture Soundtrack)
Region	Date	Format(s)	Label(s)	Ref.
Various	September 3, 2021	Digital download; streaming	WaterTower Music	
Various	April 15, 2022	LP	Waxwork Records	
