= Gypsy (TV series) =

2017 American psychological thriller television series

- Promotional poster
- Genre: Drama; Psychological thriller
- Created by: Lisa Rubin
- Starring: Naomi Watts; Billy Crudup; Sophie Cookson; Lucy Boynton; Karl Glusman; Melanie Liburd; Poorna Jagannathan; Brenda Vaccaro; Brooke Bloom
- Opening theme: "Gypsy" by Stevie Nicks
- Country of origin: United States
- Original language: English
- No. of seasons: 1
- No. of episodes: 10

Production
- Executive producers: Lisa Rubin; Liza Chasin; Tim Bevan; Eric Fellner; Naomi Watts; Sam Taylor-Johnson; Sean Jablonski
- Production location: New York City
- Running time: 46–58 minutes
- Production companies: Rhythm Arts Entertainment; Working Title Television; Pen and Paper Industries; Universal Television

Original release
- Network: Netflix
- Release: June 30, 2017

Gypsy is an American psychological thriller drama television series created by Lisa Rubin for Netflix. Naomi Watts stars as Jean Holloway, a psychologist who secretly infiltrates the private lives of her patients. Billy Crudup co-stars as her husband Michael. The first season comprises 10 episodes and was released on June 30, 2017.

In February 2016, Sam Taylor-Johnson was announced as the director for the first two episodes of the series, in addition to an executive producer. Moreover, Lisa Rubin serves as executive producer and showrunner.

Stevie Nicks re-recorded an acoustic version of her Fleetwood Mac song "Gypsy" to serve as the show's theme song. On August 11, 2017, the show was cancelled after one season.

== Cast and characters ==
=== Main ===
- Naomi Watts as Jean Holloway, PhD, a clinical psychologist based in New York City, who oversteps personal and professional boundaries as she begins to develop relationships with people close to her patients, under the alias Diane Hart
- Billy Crudup as Michael Holloway, Jean's husband and a partner at Cooper, Woolf & Stein
- Sophie Cookson as Sidney Pierce, a manipulative, attractive woman who is a member of a band, the Vagabond Hotel; she also works as a barista, is Sam's ex-girlfriend, and falls in love with Jean
- Karl Glusman as Sam Duffy, a young man failing to move on from a break-up with his ex-girlfriend, Sidney. He is one of Jean's patients.
- Poorna Jagannathan as Larin Inamdar, a divorced therapist, and Jean's best friend and colleague
- Brooke Bloom as Rebecca Rogers, Claire's estranged daughter
- Lucy Boynton as Allison Adams, a former college student who is addicted to drugs and is one of Jean's patients
- Melanie Liburd as Alexis Wright, Michael's personal assistant (PA), whom Jean distrusts
- Brenda Vaccaro as Claire Rogers, Rebecca's neurotic mother who is obsessed about her adult daughter's life choices and is a patient of Jean's

=== Recurring ===
- Kimberly Quinn as Holly Faitelson
- Edward Akrout as Zal
- Blythe Danner as Nancy, Jean's mother
- Frank Deal as Gary Levine
- Shiloh Fernandez as Tom
- Evan Hoyt Thompson as Frances
- Maren Heary as Dolly Holloway
- Vardaan Arora as Raj
- Erin Neufer as Emily
- Kerry Condon as Melissa Saugraves

== Episodes ==
No.	Title	Directed by	Written by	Original release date
1	"The Rabbit Hole"	Sam Taylor-Johnson	Lisa Rubin	June 30, 2017
Jean is a therapist who seems to have it all: a handsome loving husband named Michael, an adorable daughter named Dolly, and a lovely house in Connecticut. One of her patients is Sam, who has been struggling to move on from his ex-lover, Sidney. Crossing her professional boundary, Jean seeks out Sidney in a coffee shop, where she works, called The Rabbit Hole. Introducing herself as Diane and lying about her occupation, she begins to build a relationship with Sidney. Jean's other patients include Claire, an overbearing mother who desperately wants to reunite with her estranged daughter, and a dysfunctional young girl called Allison.
2	"Morgan Stop"	Sam Taylor-Johnson	Lisa Rubin	June 30, 2017
Jean tries to juggle her fascination with Sidney and her parental duties. Meanwhile, Michael and his assistant, Alexis, develop a strange relationship. Jean tracks down Claire's estranged daughter, Rebecca, who complains about her overbearing mother, making Jean question Claire's version of the story. Her boss reminds Jean that their job is to work with what their patients bring to the room. He also informs her that a hospitalized former patient of Jean's, Melissa, has been making serious accusations about what Jean did to her life. Later, Jean meets up with Sidney in a club, but their night out is interrupted by a call from Dolly, which almost exposes Jean's true identity. Jean rushes home where she and Michael connect, him unaware of her night's activities.
3	"Driftwood Lane"	Scott Winant	Story by : Jessica Mecklenburg; Teleplay by : Jessica Mecklenburg & Lisa Rubin	June 30, 2017
Jean takes Michael on a surprise date in the city, during which she asks him whether he would ever have an affair. Their adventurous night out finishes in the bedroom. Prompted by a flashback involving her mother and Sidney, Jean checks in on Allison. At a birthday party for Dolly, Jean seems to be constantly on edge. The tension reaches its peak when she snaps at another parent at the party, which later leads to an argument with Michael. He thinks she made Dolly's party about herself, while Jean feels she is treated like she is invisible in her home. After the argument, Jean takes off in the middle of the night under the pretense of a work-related emergency.
4	"309"	Scott Winant	Story by : Jonathan Caren; Teleplay by : Jonathan Caren & Lisa Rubin	June 30, 2017
Michael grows suspicious of Jean's movements, while his own professional relationship with Alexis crosses over into something more personal. Jean reconnects with Sidney, who tells her that she has always been attracted to older women. Jean makes contact with Rebecca again and tries to encourage her to talk to Claire. When Sam shares with Jean that he has arranged to meet with Sidney, Jean tries to manipulate him into canceling the date. Later, Jean has her own lunch date with Sidney, who, unbeknownst to Jean, has also invited Sam to join. Jean realizes this and storms away before Sam shows up. Jean also visits Allison and tries to rescue her from an abusive relationship.
5	"The Commune"	Alik Sakharov	Sean Jablonski	June 30, 2017
Continuing with her unorthodox methods, Jean roleplays as Sidney during her session with Sam and then takes Allison to an NA meeting. The latter practice, it turns out, is encouraged by her boss. Sam runs into an ex of his, Emily, and apologizes to her. Michael becomes more suspicious of Jean after she refuses to tell him the passcode for her cellphone. Sidney and Jean have a confrontation, with Sidney telling "Diane" she is scared and "Diane" telling Sidney that she is manipulative. Jean later visits a commune Claire's daughter, Rebecca, has moved in with, where she is forced to share some of her secrets. Meanwhile, Michael spends the evening with a divorced friend, which makes him realize he does not want to end up like him. Inspired by the meeting of Rebecca's commune, Jean finds Sidney and shares a passionate kiss with her, telling her she is not scared; however, Larin spots her as she desperately tries to run away.
6	"Vagabond Hotel"	Alik Sakharov	Story by : Sneha Koorse; Teleplay by : Sneha Koorse & Lisa Rubin	June 30, 2017
After Jean and Michael spend a night together at a hotel, Jean invites Sidney for a breakfast date. Sidney then invites Jean along on an errand, which, to Jean's horror, turns out to be stealing Sam's dog from his apartment; Jean is further horrified to discover that Sam has a gun. Immediately thereafter, Sam books an emergency session with Jean in order to vent his anger; he also says that he is going to start dating Emily again. Allison's abusive boyfriend shows up insisting he join Allison's session. Emboldened by Jean's support, Allison tells him that he is not good for her. On his way out, he makes a vague threat to Jean. Later, when Jean and Sidney are out, Jean suddenly collapses and passes out, suspecting she might have been drugged by Allison's boyfriend.
7	"Euphoria"	Victoria Mahoney	Lisa Rubin	June 30, 2017
As Michael heads off to Texas accompanied by Alexis and a male colleague, Jean prepares for "the full Sidney experience". After drinks in a bar, they head to Sidney's apartment, where they throw back tequila shots and get high. Down in Texas, Michael is having a boozy night with Alexis. The episode cuts between both pairs playing Truth or Dare, inching closer and closer to crossing the line. Jean probes Sidney about her relationship with Sam and, when Sidney is not looking, deletes his messages and number from Sidney's phone. Meanwhile, Alexis dares Michael to take a midnight dip in the hotel pool, after which they retire to his room for a night cap. Meanwhile Jean and Sidney both make out, Michael resists Alexis' not-so-subtle advances and calls it a night. Jean, on the other hand, fortified by liquid courage and drugs, goes to bed with Sidney.
8	"Marfa"	Victoria Mahoney	Jonathan Caren & Lisa Rubin	June 30, 2017
Sidney grows suspicious of Jean, wanting to know more about who she really is. Jean is horrified to learn from Claire that Rebecca wants to have a session with her, so she sets out to stop it. Michael is questioned by his boss if he and Alexis slept together the previous weekend. Meanwhile, Larin questions Jean's increasingly distant behavior. Sam tells Jean about his sex life with Emily, to which Jean begins asking increasingly personal questions about his sex with Sidney. "Diane" visits Rebecca and convinces her to cut Claire off. Michael is told that Alexis wants the office to know she loves him. Jean puts Allison in "Diane"'s Upper West Side apartment, where she finds and begins to listen to Jean's tapes. Michael and Sidney meet when he visits the coffee shop, alarming Jean. Sidney uploads a photo of herself and Jean to social media after promising not to. Jean reignites her sex life with Michael by using techniques Sam used on Sidney, and tells him to never go to the coffee shop again.
9	"Neverland"	Coky Giedroyc	Sean Jablonksi & Jessica Mecklenburg	June 30, 2017
Allison's mother shows up at Jean's office, saying she has not seen or heard from her daughter in days. Jean is shocked and refuses to offer any details; she later lies to her colleagues about what Allison's mother was doing there, but they do not buy it. Sam tells Jean that he thinks she keeps pushing Sidney on him so she can continue to control him, telling her that their sessions are over. Meanwhile, Michael confronts Alexis about starting a false rumor about what they did in Texas, admitting that he does have feelings for her. Sidney nervously tells Jean that Sam is engaged to Emily and that she is afraid everyone in her life, including Jean, is leaving her. Jean calls Sam and asks to meet. Before Dolly's play, Jean receives a call from an unknown number but does not answer it. At the end of the play, Jean hears a voicemail from a frantic Allison, urging her to call her back; she is soon informed that Allison is missing.
10	"Black Barn"	Coky Giedroyc	Lisa Rubin	June 30, 2017
Jean is questioned by Detective Kelly about Allison's whereabouts, pointing to Tom as the suspect. Sidney visits Jean's apartment and discovers drugs belonging to Allison. Jean convinces Sidney to go to Sam's engagement party and later sends her a story written by Alexis, pretending it is "Diane"'s. Sidney discovers that Alexis is the real author and goes to confronts her, finding a picture of Jean on Michael's desk. Angry at Jean's deception, Michael tries to begin an affair with Alexis, who tells him she is seeing someone. Jean makes Sam come back in for another appointment, where she manipulates him into thinking that he really only wants Sidney, something she helped to do by going to his engagement party. Kelly rules out Tom as a suspect and tells Jean he will be checking out the apartment. Jean cleans all the evidence of her being there, but leaves a picture of her mother that Kelly finds. Jean tells Michael she wants to commit to him fully. As Jean finishes an anti-bullying speech at Dolly's school, Sidney walks in and makes eye contact with Jean. The two exchange a mischievous smile.

== Reception ==
The show received generally negative reviews. Review aggregator website Rotten Tomatoes gave the first season a 40% rating based on 42 reviews, with an average rating of 5.15/10. The critics consensus states, "Gypsy's ludicrous plot trudges along, dragging a talented cast with it." Metacritic gave the season a rating of 45 out of 100, based on 21 critics, indicating "mixed or average reviews". In a negative review for The New York Times, James Poniewozik found the show dull and boring, writing: "Binge-watching it is like binge-drinking cough syrup". Poniewozik did, however, praise the production value and acting.

The show has been criticized by Roma organizations for its use of the term "gypsy". Many Romani people consider this to be an ethnic slur due to its historical use in antiziganist violence, including laws authorizing the enslavement, branding, deportations, and murder of Romanichal (British Roma) during the Tudor period in England.
