= Shawn Ashmore =

Canadian actor (born 1979)

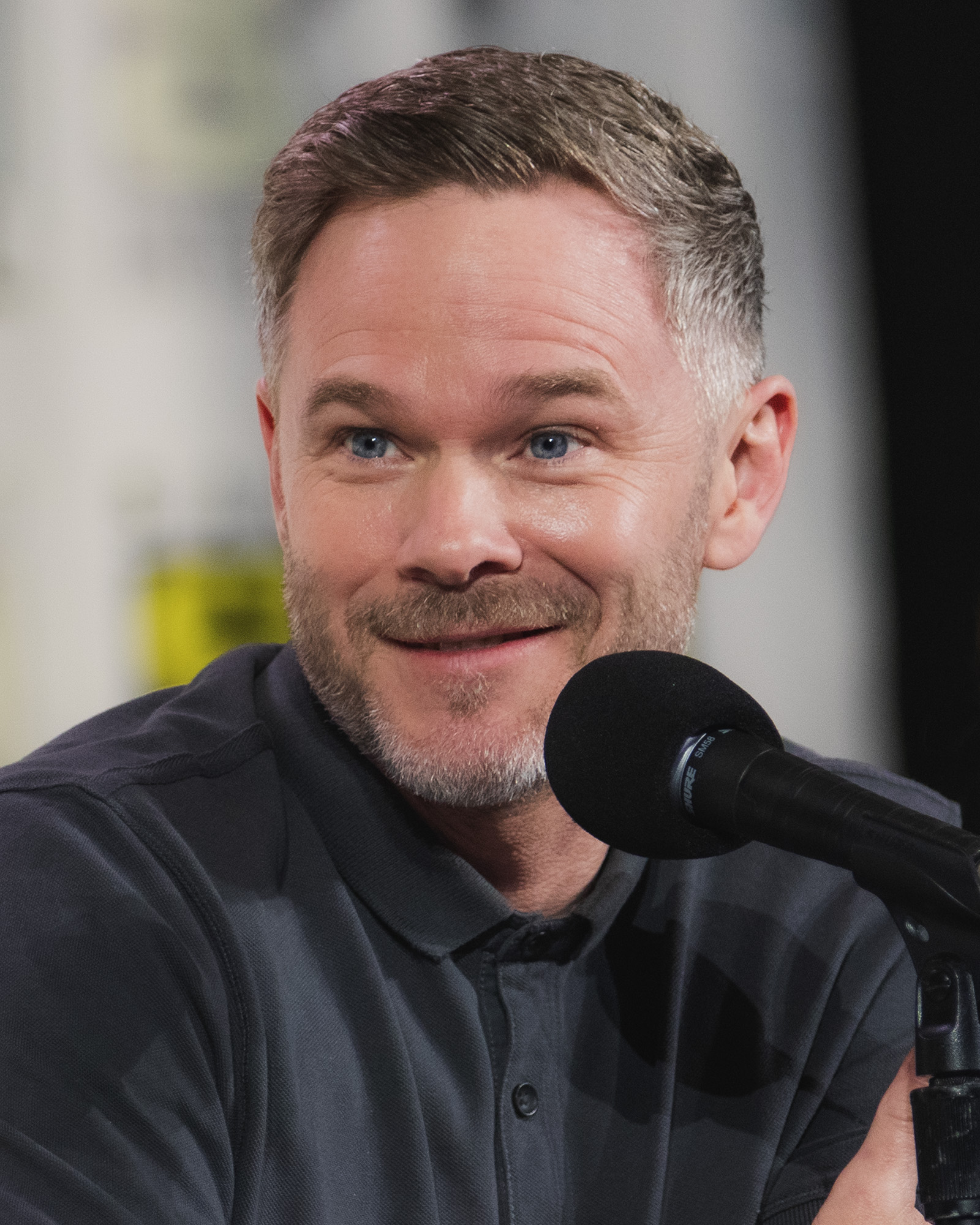
- Ashmore in 2026
- Born: Shawn Robert Ashmore; October 7, 1979 (age 46); Richmond, British Columbia, Canada
- Occupation: Actor
- Years active: 1989–present
- Spouse: Dana Renee Wasdin (m. 2012)
- Children: 1
- Relatives: Aaron Ashmore (twin brother)

Shawn Robert Ashmore (born October 7, 1979) is a Canadian actor known for roles in film, television, and interactive media. He is the identical twin brother of actor Aaron Ashmore. He began acting in his youth, notably portraying Jake Berenson in Nickelodeon's television series Animorphs (1998–1999), Tyler Connell in Disney Channel's television series In a Heartbeat (2000–2001), and Brad Rigby in the Disney Channel Original Movie Cadet Kelly (2002). At age 14, Ashmore received a Gemini nomination for Best Performance in a Children's/Youth Program for his starring role in the television film Guitarman (1994).

Ashmore gained international recognition for his role as Bobby Drake / Iceman in the 20th Century Fox's X-Men films (2000–2014), winning the 2004 MTV Movie Award for Breakthrough Male Performance for X2. His later film roles include Canadian hero Terry Fox in Terry (2005), and lead roles in the horror films The Ruins (2008) and Frozen (2010).

On television, Ashmore portrayed FBI agent Mike Weston in The Following (2013–2015), and since 2018, he has starred as attorney Wesley Evers in the police procedural drama The Rookie. He has also headlined several video games, providing voice and performance capture for Quantum Break (2016), The Dark Pictures Anthology: Man of Medan (2019), Alan Wake II (2023), and others. Ashmore received a Leo Award for Legend of Earthsea (2004) and has earned multiple Gemini and Saturn Award nominations.

== Early life and education ==
Shawn Robert Ashmore was born on October 7, 1979, in Richmond, British Columbia, to Linda Davis, a homemaker, and Rick Ashmore, a senior manager in the floor-covering industry. When he was a few weeks old, his family moved to St. Albert, Alberta, where he spent much of his early childhood. Around age ten, Ashmore relocated with his family to Brampton, Ontario, where he later attended Turner Fenton Secondary School.

Ashmore and his identical twin brother, Aaron, began appearing in television commercials while still in elementary school. According to Shawn, the brothers began acting after a talent agent approached their mother and invited the twins to audition for a commercial. Aaron was initially cast but when he fell ill on the day of filming, Shawn replaced him, landing his first acting role. Early in their careers, casting directors sometimes chose between the identical twins by flipping a coin.

== Career ==
=== Early work and breakthrough (1990s–2004) ===
At age nine, Ashmore made his screen debut on the CTV series Katts and Dog (1990). The following year, he and his brother appeared in minor roles in the feature film Married to It (1991). Ashmore's first starring role was in the family television film Guitarman (1994), which, at age 14, earned him a Gemini Award nomination for Best Performance in a Children's/Youth Program. In his late teens, Ashmore chose to pursue acting full-time after realizing he was happiest while working on set.

Ashmore's first regular television role was Jake Berenson in Animorphs (1998–1999), a Nickelodeon adaptation of K. A. Applegate's popular children's science fiction books. Reflecting on the series in 2022, Ashmore said the show's enduring popularity "is so crazy to me", adding he is "always amazed" when fans still recognize him from the show. He then starred as EMT cadet Tyler Connell in the Disney Channel series In a Heartbeat (2000–2001) and portrayed cadet major Brad Rigby in the Disney Channel Original Movie Cadet Kelly (2002). He later described this phase of his career during his late teens and early twenties as "a real Nickelodeon/Disney moment".

Ashmore debuted as Bobby Drake / Iceman in X-Men (2000). The film was a commercial success, grossing US$296.3 million worldwide and launching a franchise in which Ashmore reprised his role in sequels. He guest-starred as Eric Summers in two episodes of Smallville (2002, 2004), a series in which his brother later portrayed Jimmy Olsen. Ashmore returned as Iceman in an expanded role in X2 (2003), receiving the MTV Movie Award for Best Breakthrough Male Performance in 2004. During the lead-up to the film's release, Ashmore reflected on the growing public attention, saying his family "were a little freaked out when they started realizing that my face was going to be on buses and at movie theatres".

In December 2004, Ashmore starred as the young wizard Ged in the Syfy miniseries Legend of Earthsea an adaption of Ursula K. Le Guin's novels. The production received mixed reviews; Tom Shales of The Washington Post wrote: "Ashmore makes a likable and modest hero". His performance earned him the 2005 Leo Award for Best Lead Performance by a Male in a Feature Length Drama.

=== Film and television (2005–2015) ===
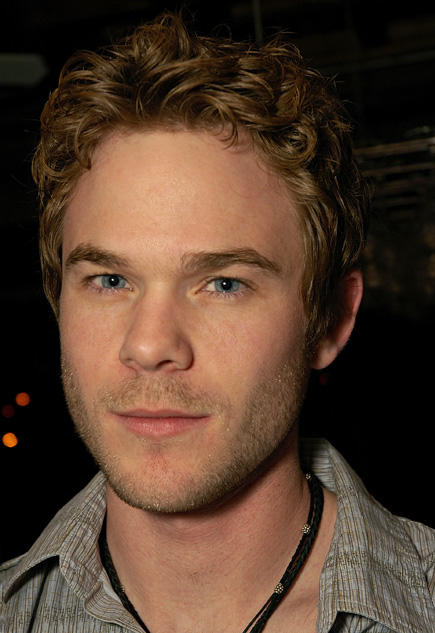
Ashmore in January 2010

In 2005, Ashmore portrayed Canadian athlete Terry Fox in the CTV biographical film Terry (2005), dramatizing Fox's long-distance run Marathon of Hope. Reflecting on the role, Ashmore noted: "the roughest part is the physicality, learning the skip-hop to make it real, and remembering and knowing the movement". His performance earned him a Gemini Award nomination for Best Actor. Also in 2005, he played Rob Donovan, a prep school student who is coerced into a stolen-car ring, in the action-comedy Underclassman. He also headlined one of three intersecting stories in the HIV/AIDs drama 3 Needles, anchoring the Canadian segment, which depicts the ripple effects of a hidden HIV diagnosis. He closed the year with the psychological thriller The Quiet, portraying basketball player Connor Kennedy, who befriends a social outcast named Dot.

In May 2006, Ashmore reprised his role as Iceman in X-Men: The Last Stand, the third installment of 20th Century Fox's X-Men film series. He also voiced the character in the tie-in video game X-Men: The Official Game, bridging the events between X2 and The Last Stand. In 2008, he starred as Eric in the horror film The Ruins, portraying an American tourist in Mexico who is enticed to visit a remote Mayan ruin in the jungle. The following year, Ashmore starred in the CTV telefilm Diverted (2009), playing an air‑traffic manager dealing with flights grounded in Newfoundland during the 2001 September 11 attacks in the United States. He also voiced Iceman again in several episodes of the animated series The Super Hero Squad Show.

In 2010, Ashmore portrayed Joe Lynch in Adam Green's dramatic thriller Frozen and co‑starred as George Barnum in the ensemble horror remake Mother's Day. Subsequently, he starred as Fitz, a hard-living air-ambulance doctor in the eight-part miniseries Bloodletting & Miraculous Cures, which was adapted from Vincent Lam's Giller Prize–winning stories. Ashmore also served as an executive producer on the series, which received nine Gemini nominations. That November, Ashmore and his brother Aaron guest-starred in the Fringe episode "Amber 31422"; Den of Geek praised their performances, describing both actors as "rather good". The episode marked the first project on which the brothers had collaborated in fifteen years. Discussing their decision to work together, Ashmore said: "It's usually because the stuff that came along is kind of hokey, but I think the quality of Fringe is really high and the episode is done well and our characters are intelligent. We're going to have some fun."

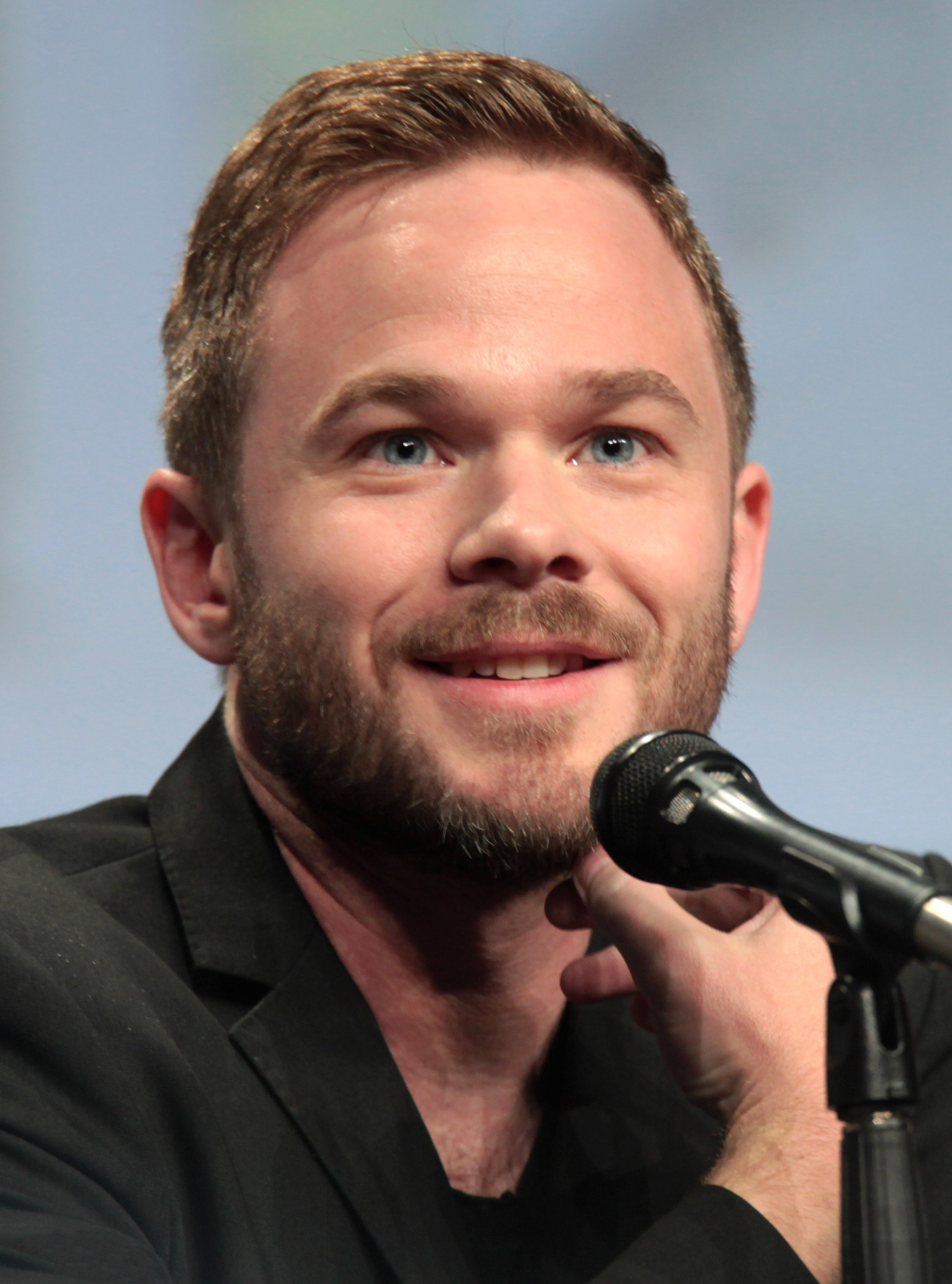
Ashmore in 2014

In 2011, Ashmore played Adam, one of five survivors who are besieged by cannibals, in the post-apocalyptic thriller The Day. The film premiered in the Midnight Madness programme at Toronto International Film Festival and was later acquired for U.S. distribution by WWE Studios. He next starred in the bilingual road-movie romance Mariachi Gringo (2012), portraying Edward, an aimless Kansan man who relocates to Guadalajara to become a mariachi singer. The film premiered as the opening-night gala of the 29th Miami International Film Festival. From 2013 to 2015, Ashmore starred as FBI special agent Mike Weston on Fox's crime thriller series The Following. Weston remained a central character throughout the show's three-season run. In 2014, Ashmore reprised his role as Iceman in X-Men: Days of Future Past, appearing alongside both returning cast members from the first three films and the cast of the prequel film X-Men: First Class. He praised the decision to unite the original and prequel casts into one film, calling it "a very interesting and smart way to continue telling this story".

=== Continued screen work and video game debut (2016–2020) ===
In 2016, Ashmore moved into interactive media, starring in Microsoft's and Remedy Entertainment's action-adventure game Quantum Break. Using full-body performance capture and voice acting, he portrayed the time-manipulating protagonist Jack Joyce in both gameplay sequences and the game's live-action companion episodes. Upon its release, Quantum Break became Microsoft Studios' best-selling new Xbox One intellectual property and the platform's most-played new title in its launch week. Game Informer praised Ashmore for giving Jack Joyce "the scope and complexity to be interesting for such long periods of time", highlighting his natural banter and effective escalation of tension during action sequences. That same year, Ashmore returned to network television as Assistant District Attorney Sam Spencer in the American legal drama Conviction.

Ashmore subsequently appeared in several genre films. He starred as Deputy Conrad "Colt" Salter in the science-fiction horror film Devil's Gate, which premiered at the 2017 Tribeca Film Festival, and portrayed troubled brother Officer Darryl Tarasoff in the Canadian mystery Hollow in the Land (2017). In 2018, he appeared in the action thriller Acts of Violence as a Cleveland police officer who is pursuing a human‑trafficking ring. That same year, Ashmore began a recurring role as defense attorney Wesley Evers on the police-procedural television series The Rookie. In 2019, he appeared in Hulu's anthology series Into the Dark, playing migrant‑rights activist Thomas in the Independence Day–themed episode "Culture Shock". He also continued his interactive media work by providing voice, likeness, and motion capture for the playable character Conrad in the horror game The Dark Pictures Anthology: Man of Medan (2019).

In 2020, Ashmore had a recurring role as Lamplighter, a former member of the superhero group the Seven, in the second season of the Amazon Prime Video superhero series The Boys. Reflecting on the role, Ashmore noted the contrast with his earlier portrayal of Bobby Drake / Iceman, whom he described as "the quintessential good guy", saying his casting as Lamplighter "wasn't a coincidence". He said: "One of the things I liked about The Boys is that they subvert the genre, and I really got to lean into that". Series creator Eric Kripke said Ashmore initially auditioned for another part, but Kripke "really wanted to get him into the show" and considered him "perfect" for Lamplighter due to Ashmore's "X-Men pedigree" and strong acting. Ashmore enjoyed the irony, stating it was fun to play "both sides of a superhero".

=== Television main cast and expanded game work (2021–present) ===
In 2021, Ashmore appeared in two thriller features. He portrayed Kevin Dadich in the Netflix release Aftermath and starred as Nick Miller, an increasingly controlling husband, in the psychological‑horror film The Free Fall, which premiered on October 7 at Grimmfest. That same year, his recurring role as defence attorney Wesley Evers on ABC's show The Rookie was upgraded to a main-cast position at the start of the third season. He reprised the Evers role in "Standoff", a 2022 episode of the spin‑off show The Rookie: Feds.

In 2023, Ashmore provided voice acting and motion capture for Sheriff Tim Breaker in Remedy Entertainment's survival-horror game Alan Wake II. In the game's downloadable content, Ashmore portrayed an alternate-reality version of himself filming a time-travel game scene, a sequence one reviewer described as "a real fourth wall break" that is filled with references and in-jokes about Ashmore's earlier role in Quantum Break. Remedy's Sam Lake noted this character was written specifically for Ashmore as a nod to his earlier collaboration.

Ashmore continued working in interactive media by voicing Timmy LeBlanc in Sons of the Forest (2023). GamesRadar+ reported Ashmore joined the cast as side character Timmy LeBlanc, noting the game's February 2024 update would expand his character's role in the story. In 2025, Ashmore starred as Randall Harris in the supernatural-horror film It Feeds, which was directed by Chad Archibald.

Ashmore co-starred in Just Breathe, a crime thriller marking director Paul Pompa III's feature debut. The film was in post-production in late 2024, and in June 2025, Shout! Studios acquired its North American distribution rights. It had a digital release that September. Ashmore is also set to star in the psychological thriller The Huntsman, which will be directed by Kyle Kauwika Harris. The film, which is based on Judith Sanders's novel, features Ashmore as a repressed ICU nurse who volunteers to read to a comatose patient who is suspected of serial murders.

== Personal life ==
On July 27, 2012, Shawn Ashmore married Dana Renee Wasdin in Los Angeles; the couple met on the set of the thriller Frozen, where Wasdin served as an assistant director. They have one son, who was born in 2017.

Ashmore and his twin brother Aaron have matching "GMA" tattoos on their wrists. According to Aaron, the initials stand for "Good Man Ashmore", honouring their step-grandfather Gangu Jagtiani, who married their grandmother before the twins were born and was regarded as their grandfather. Ashmore has supported breast cancer awareness causes. In October 2021, he participated in a virtual meet‑and‑greet auction run by the non-profit A Cause for Entertainment, proceeds from which went to breast-cancer research and patient support.

== Filmography ==
Key
†	Denotes films that have not yet been released

=== Film ===
Year	Title	Role	Notes
1991	Married to It	Student in pageant	
1998	All I Wanna Do	Photographer	Originally titled The Hairy Bird
2000	X-Men	Bobby Drake / Iceman	
2001	Wolf Girl	Beau	
2002	Cadet Kelly	Brad Rigby	
2003	X2	Bobby Drake / Iceman	MTV Movie Award for Best Breakthrough Performance; Nominated—MTV Movie Award for Best Kiss (with Anna Paquin); Nominated—Saturn Award for Cinescape Genre Face of the Future (Male); Nominated—Teen Choice Award for Choice Movie: Chemistry (with Anna Paquin)
2005	Underclassman	Rob Donovan	
2005	3 Needles	Denys, the porn actor	
2005	The Quiet	Connor	
2006	X-Men: The Last Stand	Bobby Drake / Iceman	
2008	Solstice	Christian	
2008	The Ruins	Eric	
2010	Frozen	Joe Lynch	
2010	Mother's Day	George Barnum	
2010	Hatchet II	Fisherman #1	
2011	The Day	Adam	
2012	Mariachi Gringo	Edward	
2012	Already Gone (short)	Jude Mulvey	
2012	The Barrens	Dale	
2012	Breaking the Girls	Eric	
2014	X-Men: Days of Future Past	Bobby Drake / Iceman	
2014	Happy Halloween (short)	David	
2016	Home Invasion	N/A	Executive producer
2017	Devil's Gate	Conrad "Colt" Salter	
2017	Hollow in the Land	Darryl	
2018	Acts of Violence	Brandon	
2020	Darkness Falls	Jeff Anderson	
2021	Aftermath	Kevin Dadich	
2021	The Free Fall	Nick Miller	
2025	It Feeds	Randall Harris	
2025	Just Breathe	Chester	
2026	The Huntsman	Max Mason	

=== Television ===
Year	Title	Role	Notes
1990	Katts and Dog		Episode: "Mistaken Identity"
1992	The Ray Bradbury Theater	Charlie	Episode: "Colonel Stonesteel and the Desperate Empties"
1992–1993	Mr. Dressup	Shawn	4 episodes
1993	Gross Misconduct: The Life of Brian Spencer	Young Brian Spencer	Television film
1994	Guitarman	Waylon Tibbins	Television film Nominated—Gemini Award for Best Performance in a Children's/Youth Program
1997	Any Mother's Son	Billy	Television film
1997	Flash Forward	Gord	Episode: "Mudpack"
1997	Promise the Moon	Leviatus Bennett	Television film
1997	Melanie Darrow	David Abbott	Television film
1997	Fast Track	Young Chandler	Episode: "Combustions"
1998–1999	Animorphs	Jake	Main role
1999	The City	Tyler	Episode: "Departures"
1999	Real Kids, Real Adventures	Aaron Hall	Episode: "Mountain Lion"
1999	At the Mercy of a Stranger	Danny	Television film
2000	Earth: Final Conflict	Max	Episode: "Sanctuary"
2000	The Famous Jett Jackson	Chet	Episode: "What You Wish For"
2000–2001	In a Heartbeat	Tyler Connell	Main role
2001	The Big House	Trevor Brewster	Television film
2001	Blackout	First Son	Television film
2001	The Outer Limits	Morris Shottwell	Episode: "Lion's Den"
2002	Aces		Television film
2002–2004	Smallville	Eric Summers	Episodes: "Leech", "Asylum"
2004	Earthsea	Ged	Miniseries; Leo Award for Best Lead Performance By a Male in a Feature Length Drama
2005	Terry	Terry Fox	Television film Nominated—Gemini Award for Best Performance by an Actor in a Leading Role in a Dramatic Program or Mini-Series
2009	Diverted	Mike Stiven	Television film
2009–2010	The Super Hero Squad Show	Bobby Drake / Iceman (voice)	2 episodes
2010	Bloodletting & Miraculous Cures	Fitz	Miniseries
2010	Fringe	Joshua Rose	Episode: "Amber 31422"
2013–2015	The Following	Mike Weston	Main role
2016	Relationship Status	Ben	3 episodes
2016–2017	Conviction	Sam Spencer	Main role
2018	S.W.A.T.	William Tanner	1 episode
2018–present	The Rookie	Wesley Evers	Recurring role (seasons 1–2); main role (season 3–present)
2019	Into the Dark	Thomas	Episode: "Culture Shock"
2020	The Boys	Lamplighter	3 episodes
2022	The Rookie: Feds	Wesley Evers	Episode: "Standoff"

=== Video games ===
Year	Title	Voice role	Notes
2006	X-Men: The Official Game	Bobby Drake / Iceman	
2016	Quantum Break	Jack Joyce	Also likeness and motion capture
2019	The Dark Pictures Anthology: Man of Medan	Conrad	Also likeness and motion capture
2023	Alan Wake II	Tim Breaker	Also likeness and motion capture
2024	Alan Wake II: Night Springs	The Sheriff / the Actor	Also likeness and motion capture
2024	Sons of the Forest	Timmy	

== Awards and nominations ==
Year	Award	Category	Work	Result	Ref.
1995	Gemini Awards	Best Performance in a Children's/Youth Program	Guitarman	Nominated	
2003	Saturn Awards	Cinescape Genre Face of the Future (Male)	X2	Nominated	
2003	Teen Choice Awards	Choice Movie – Chemistry (with Anna Paquin)	X2	Nominated	.
2004	MTV Movie & TV Awards	Best Breakthrough Male Performance	X2	Won	
2004	MTV Movie & TV Awards	Best Kiss (with Anna Paquin)	X2	Nominated	
2005	Leo Awards	Best Lead Performance by a Male in a Feature Length Drama	Legend of Earthsea	Won	
2006	Gemini Awards	Best Actor in a Dramatic Program or Mini‑Series	Terry	Nominated	
2016	Golden Joystick Awards	Performance of the Year	Quantum Break	Nominated	
2017	NAVGTR Awards	Performance in a Drama, Lead	Quantum Break	Nominated	
