= Ice Cream in the Cupboard =

2019 American independent drama film

- Film poster
- Directed by: Drew Pollins
- Written by: John Rae; Jarret Rosenblatt
- Based on: Ice Cream in the Cupboard by Pat Moffett
- Produced by: Cemile Turam; Branden Cobb
- Starring: Dana Ashbrook; Claudia Ferri; Jaime King; Tobin Bell; Andrea Londo; Garrett Mercer
- Cinematography: Ian Holliday
- Edited by: David Scorca
- Music by: Miles Bergsma
- Release date: August 7, 2019 (Rhode Island International Film Festival)
- Running time: 90 minutes
- Country: United States
- Language: English

Ice Cream in the Cupboard is a 2019 American independent biographical romantic drama film directed by Drew Pollins and starring Dana Ashbrook, Claudia Ferri, Jaime King, Tobin Bell, Andrea Londo and Garrett Mercer. It is based on the book by Pat Moffett. The film premiered at the 2019 Rhode Island International Film Festival, where it won Best Feature Film – Narrative.

== Plot summary ==
After Pat (Dana Ashbrook) is attacked by his wife Carmen (Claudia Ferri), his world begins to unravel as he comes to terms with her diagnosis of early-onset Alzheimer's disease.

== Cast ==
- Jaime King as Dr. Giselle Cohen
- Tobin Bell as Pop
- Dana Ashbrook as Pat
- Sean Whalen as Doug Hannigan
- Amber Frank as Lydia
- Claudia Ferri as Carmen
- Andrea Londo as Young Carmen
- Garrett Mercer as Young Pat
