= Make It Work! =

- Written by: Hannah Levy, Adriana Robles
- Directed by: Hannah Levy; Adriana Robles
- Creative director: Hannah Levy
- Starring: Various people
- Narrated by: Various people
- Country of origin: United States
- Original language: English

Production
- Executive producers: Hannah Levy & Adriana Robles
- Production company: Levy/Robles Productions

Original release
- Network: The CW
- Release: August 26, 2020

Make It Work! is an American television special premiered on The CW on August 26, 2020. It focuses on group of women trying to help and support in the fight against the COVID-19 pandemic.

== Appearances ==
- Mara Brock Akil
- Lake Bell
- Alison Brie
- Connie Britton
- Nkechi Okoro Carroll
- Rosario Dawson
- Beanie Feldstein
- Jane Fonda
- Jennifer Garner
- Elizabeth Gillies
- Kathryn Hahn
- Rachael Harris
- Cheryl Hines
- Sarah Jeffery
- Marta Kauffman
- Javicia Leslie
- Melanie Liburd
- Catt Sadler
- Andrea Savage
- Sherri Shepherd
- Alexandra Shipp
- Rain Valdez
- Michaela Watkins
- Kym Whitley
- Alfre Woodard
