= Kam Kardashian =

- Genre: Web series; Comedy
- Written by: Fawzia Mirza; Ryan Logan
- Directed by: Ryan Logan
- Starring: Fawzia Mirza; Mary Hollis Inboden; Joel Kim Booster
- Country of origin: United States
- Original language: English
- No. of seasons: 2
- No. of episodes: 12

Production
- Producer: Fawzia Mirza
- Production locations: Chicago, Illinois
- Cinematography: Amanda Clifford

Original release
- Release: February 14, 2012 – February 13, 2014

Kam Kardashian is an American web series written by Fawzia Mirza and Ryan Logan and directed by Logan, which premiered on February 14, 2012, via YouTube. Filmed in Chicago, IL, the comedic show chronicles the day to day adventures of Kameron (Fawzia Mirza), the fictional long-lost lesbian sister from a very famous family, and her best friend Mary Hollis (Mary Hollis Inboden). The show is directed by Ryan Logan, shot by Amanda Clifford, and based on a character created by Fawzia Mirza. In January 2013, it announced it would return for season two after a successful Kickstarter campaign, premiering in mid-March.

It has been praised for its representation of LGBT characters and has been viewed over 200,000 times online since 2012.

== Plot ==
Kam Kardashian is a web series that follows Kameron, the fictional long-lost lesbian Kardashian sister who was cut off, kicked out, and left to fend for herself. This sticky-fingered vixen loves whiskey and women, and most of all: yearns to re-insert herself into the Kardashian krown by any means possible (whether it be through petty crime, Photoshop, or her slightly unbalanced best friend, Mary Hollis).

== Cast ==
- Fawzia Mirza as Kam Kardashian
- Mary Hollis Inboden as BFF
- Mark Ratermen as Mark
- Joel Kim Booster as Joel, the Unpaid Asian Intern
- Beth Stelling as Agent Stone
- Mouzam Makkar
- Kelly Simpkins
- Candy Lawrence
- Sadie Rogers
- The Puterbaugh Sisters

== Episodes ==
=== Season 1 ===
- Episode 1, The Gay One
- Episode 2, Haircut
- Episode 3, BFF
- Episode 4, Hustlin'

=== Season 2 ===
- Episode 1, Orange You GLAWD (You're Not Kam Kardashian)
- Episode 2.1B Asian Intern Remix
- Episode 2, First Date
- Episode 3, One Night Stand
- Episode 4, Internment
- Episode 5, Fan Fiction Pt 1
- Episode 6, Fan Fiction Pt 2
- Episode 7, Therapy
- Episode 8, Fashion Forward

== Impact and reception ==
=== Critical reaction ===
While fundraising for Season 2, Indiewire named Kam Kardashian Project of the Week. Tubefilter chided, "For my money, Kam is more worthwhile than any of her sisters." Curve (magazine) said, "Mirza and Logan collectively add something flavorful and relevant to the evolution of gay characters simply being themselves and doing regular things". Placevine raves, "While I can't tell if it's entirely scripted or totally improv (always a good sign of quality acting and direction), it's hilarious... star Fawzia Mirza makes it all seem so fresh, especially with its uniquely LGBTQ spin."

=== Series intent ===
After debuting the satirical comedy, the creators of the show addressed their intent. "One thing that was really important... was not to do "mean-spirited" comedy," says Mirza, who ultimately respects the famous family for their savvy "force in popular culture." And considering the Kardashians frequently wind up as the butt of a joke (no pun intended) on late-night television, it was important to establish a character in Kam Kardashian that made sense to anyone watching it.

Director, Ryan Logan, commented, "At the end of the day, Kam is just trying to live up to her family's legacy and gain her parents' approval. We can all identify with that. Hers just happens to be the most famous family on the planet. She's flawed and, compared with her family and "proper society" at large, stratospherically an outsider."

=== Cross over appearance ===
Kam Kardashian crossed over into other web series in 2014. Fawzia Mirza appeared as 'Kam Kardashian' in Season 2 of the hit web series Kiss Her I'm Famous starring Tracy Ryerson and Ilea Matthews and featuring in Season 2 Noureen DeWulf. The series is written, directed and edited by filmmaker Rolla Selbak. The series was released on tellofilms.com.
