= Signature Move =

2017 film by Jennifer Reeder

- سیگنیچر موو
- Directed by: Jennifer Reeder
- Written by: Fawzia Mirza; Lisa Donato
- Produced by: Brian Hieggelke; Fawzia Mirza; Eugene Sun Park
- Starring: Fawzia Mirza; Shabana Azmi; Sari Sanchez; Audrey Francis; Charin Alvarez
- Cinematography: Christopher Rejano
- Release date: March 11, 2017 (SXSW)
- Country: United States
- Languages: English; Urdu; Spanish

Signature Move is a 2017 American indie comedy-drama film directed by Jennifer Reeder and co-written and produced by Fawzia Mirza about a Pakistani Muslim lesbian living in Chicago with her mother. Mirza also introduced herself as a lesbian on Twitter before the film was announced. The film premiered at the 2017 South by Southwest Film Festival.

== Premise ==
Zaynab, a thirty-something woman living in Chicago, takes care of her TV-obsessed mother Parveen. As Zaynab falls for Alma, a bold and very bright Mexican woman, she searches for her identity in life, love and wrestling.

== Cast ==
- Fawzia Mirza as Zaynab
- Shabana Azmi as Parveen
- Sari Sanchez as Alma
- Audrey Francis as Jayde
- Charin Alvarez as Rosa
- Mark Hood as Milo
- Molly Brennan as Killian
- Minita Gandhi as Hina
- Mia Park as Bookstore Customer
- The scholar Kareem Khubchandani has a cameo as a man outside on whom Parveen spies.

== Production ==
=== Casting ===
Fawzia Mirza approached Shabana Azmi in Chicago when she was there to work in a play. She signed her to play the role in the film. The film features Fawzia Mirza as a lesbian and Shabana Azmi as her mother. The cast also includes Sari Sanchez, Audrey Francis and Charin Alvarez.

=== Filming ===
Shabana Azmi moved to Chicago in early August 2016. Fawzia posted a selfie with Azmi on Instagram and announced that they have started the shooting of the film.

== Awards ==
Year	Award	Category	Result
2017	Cleveland International Film Festival	Best American Independent Feature Film	Nominated
2017	FilmOut San Diego	Audience Award - Best Actress (Fawzia Mirza)	Won
2017	FilmOut San Diego	Festival Award - Best Director (Jennifer Reeder)	Won
2017	Iris Prize Festival	Best Actress (Fawzia Mirza)	Won
2017	L.A. Outfest	Grand Jury Award - Outstanding American Narrative Feature	Won
2017	Paris Lesbian and Feminist Film Festival	Best Feature Film	Won
2017	Nashville Film Festival	Bridgestone Narrative Feature Competition	Nominated
2017	QCinema International Film Festival	Best Picture - RainbowQC Competition	Won
2017	SXSW Film Festival	SXSW Adam Yauch Hörnblowér Award (Jennifer Reeder)	Nominated
2017	SXSW Film Festival	SXSW Gamechanger Award (Jennifer Reeder)	Nominated

== See also ==
- List of LGBT-related films directed by women
