= The Conjuring: The Devil Made Me Do It (soundtrack) =

The Conjuring: The Devil Made Me Do It (Original Motion Picture Soundtrack)

Film score by Joseph Bishara
- Released: May 28, 2021
- Recorded: 2020–2021
- Studios: Newman Scoring Stage, 20th Century Studios, Los Angeles; Capitol Studios, Hollywood
- Genre: Film score
- Length: 53:25
- Label: WaterTower Music
- Producer: Joseph Bishara

Joseph Bishara chronology
The Unholy (2021)	The Conjuring: The Devil Made Me Do It (2021)	Malignant (2021)

The Conjuring: The Devil Made Me Do It (Original Motion Picture Soundtrack) is the film score to the 2021 film The Conjuring: The Devil Made Me Do It, which is the sequel to The Conjuring 2 (2016), and the seventh installment in The Conjuring Universe. Joseph Bishara composed the film score which was released under the WaterTower Music label on May 28, 2021.

== Development ==
In October 2019, franchise veteran Joseph Bishara—who also composed the scores for The Conjuring, (2014) and The Conjuring 2—confirmed his involvement for the then-untitled third Conjuring film. Bishara started writing the tunes for the film during the same month. The recording of the score happened at the Newman Scoring Stage at 20th Century Studios lot and Capitol Studios in Hollywood, Los Angeles. The recording happened at multiple fragmentations having adhered to the COVID-19 safety protocols.

== Reception ==
David Rooney of The Hollywood Reporter summarized that "the groaning soundscape works in tandem with Bishara's big scary-ass score to creep under the audience's skin." Christopher Garner of Movie Music UK wrote "If you like music that scares you, and if you don't require said music to have any kind of melodic hook, you could give this a shot." Ben of Soundtrack Universe wrote "Ultimately The Devil Made Me Do It is easily the most "accessible" of Bishara's horror outings thus far, though any curious listeners should still approach with caution... this is a highly avant garde horror score, after all." Christopher John of The Curb wrote "Joseph Bishara delivers his typical ultra-creepy score made of inhuman noises and scattered string sections."

Eammon Jacobs of Radio Times mentioned it as an "eerie score". Chris Bumbray of JoBlo.com wrote "Joseph Bishara contributes a creepy score to liven up the action". Laura Potier of Starburst noted that Bishara's score "ensures that gore hounds will leave the theatre satisfied." Santa Fe Reporter noted that "everything is intensified by Joseph Bishara's score".

== Track listing ==
No.	Title	Length
1.	"Devil Opening"	0:54
2.	"Ease Into Night"	1:00
3.	"Wilds Of The Devil"	5:00
4.	"The Conjuring: The Devil Made Me Do It"	0:45
5.	"Stabilized"	1:07
6.	"How We Met"	1:02
7.	"Cut Close"	1:54
8.	"Possession Measured"	2:34
9.	"Witch Totem"	2:52
10.	"Reason You're Here"	3:15
11.	"Psychic Evidence"	2:10
12.	"Something Happened Here"	0:58
13.	"Know What You Did"	3:33
14.	"Holy Water"	2:32
15.	"Beast Asserting"	1:20
16.	"Morgue Visit1"	2:04
17.	"Black Candles"	2:39
18.	"In Your Vision"	2:27
19.	"A Visitor"	1:08
20.	"Unclean Spirit"	1:36
21.	"Occult Connection"	2:29
22.	"Altar Approached"	2:39
23.	"Wronged Forces"	2:53
24.	"Soaring Curses"	3:22
Total length:		52:13

== Additional music ==
The film featured the following songs, which were not included in the soundtrack:

- "Baby Hold on to Me" by Eddie Money
- "Call Me" by Blondie
- "Suspicious Minds" by Elvis Presley
- "Brand New Day" by Van Morrison

== Personnel ==
Credits adapted from WaterTower Music:

- Music composer and producer – Joseph Bishara
- Recording – Chris Spilfogel, Fernando Morales Franchini
- Mixing – Chris Spilfogel
- Mastering – Dave Collins
- Supervising music editor – Julie Pearce
- Music editors – Barbara McDermott, Joe E. Rand, Lisé Richardson, Oliver Hug
- Pro-tools operator – Tim Lauber
- Score coordinator – Celeste Chada
- Soundtrack coordinator – Jen O'Malley
- Music preparation – Eric Stonerook
- Art direction – Sandeep Sriram
- Music business affairs executive – John F.X. Walsh, Ray Gonzalez
- Music clearance – Jessica Dolinger
- Executive in charge of music for New Line Cinema – Erin Scully
- Executive in charge of WaterTower Music – Jason Linn

Orchestra

- Orchestra – Hollywood Studio Symphony
- Orchestrators – Brad Warnaar, Dana Niu, Rossano Galante
- Conductor – Joseph Bishara
- Orchestra contractor – Encompass Music Partners
- Concertmaster – Daphne Chen
- Bass – Christian Kollgaard, Geoffrey Osika, Stephanie Payne, Stephen Dress, Thomas Harte, Michael Valerio
- Bassoon – Damian Montano, Judith Farmer, Rose Corrigan, Anthony Parnther
- Cello – Alisha Bauer, Armen Ksajikian, Eric Byers, Jacob Braun, Timothy Loo, Vanessa Freebairn-Smith
- Clarinet – Jonathan Sacdalan, Joshua Ranz, Stuart Clark, Phil O'Connor
- Drums – Vincent Colaiuta
- Flute – Heather Clark, Jenni Olson, Julie Burkert, Sara Andon
- French horn – Dylan Hart, David Everson
- Percussion – Cory Hills, Matthew Cook, Nick Terry
- Piano – Robert Thies, Vicki Ray
- Trombone – William Reichenbach, Craig Gosnell, Phillip Keen, Steven Trapani, Steven Suminski
- Trumpet – Jon Lewis, Robert Schaer
- Tuba – Gary Hickman, Blake Cooper
- Viola – Aaron Oltman, Alma Fernandez, Andrew Duckles, Corinne Olsen, Zach Dellinger, Lauren Baba, Meredith Crawford, Leah Katz
- Violin – Alyssa Park, Benjamin Jacobson, Charlie Bisharat, Eliza James Chorley, Ina Veli, Jessica Guideri, Katie Sloan, Luanne Homzy, Marisa Kuney, Maya Magub, Molly Goldbaum, Natalie Leggett, Tamara Hatwan, Tereza Stanislav, Eric Gorfain
- Vocals – Kristin Hayter

Choir

- Choir contractor – Jasper Randall
- Choir – Andrea Zomorodian, Anna Schubert, David Kakuk, Elias Preponis, Holly Sedillos, James Larson, Joshua Das, Phoenix Reisser
