= Fawzia Mirza =

Canadian actor and filmmaker

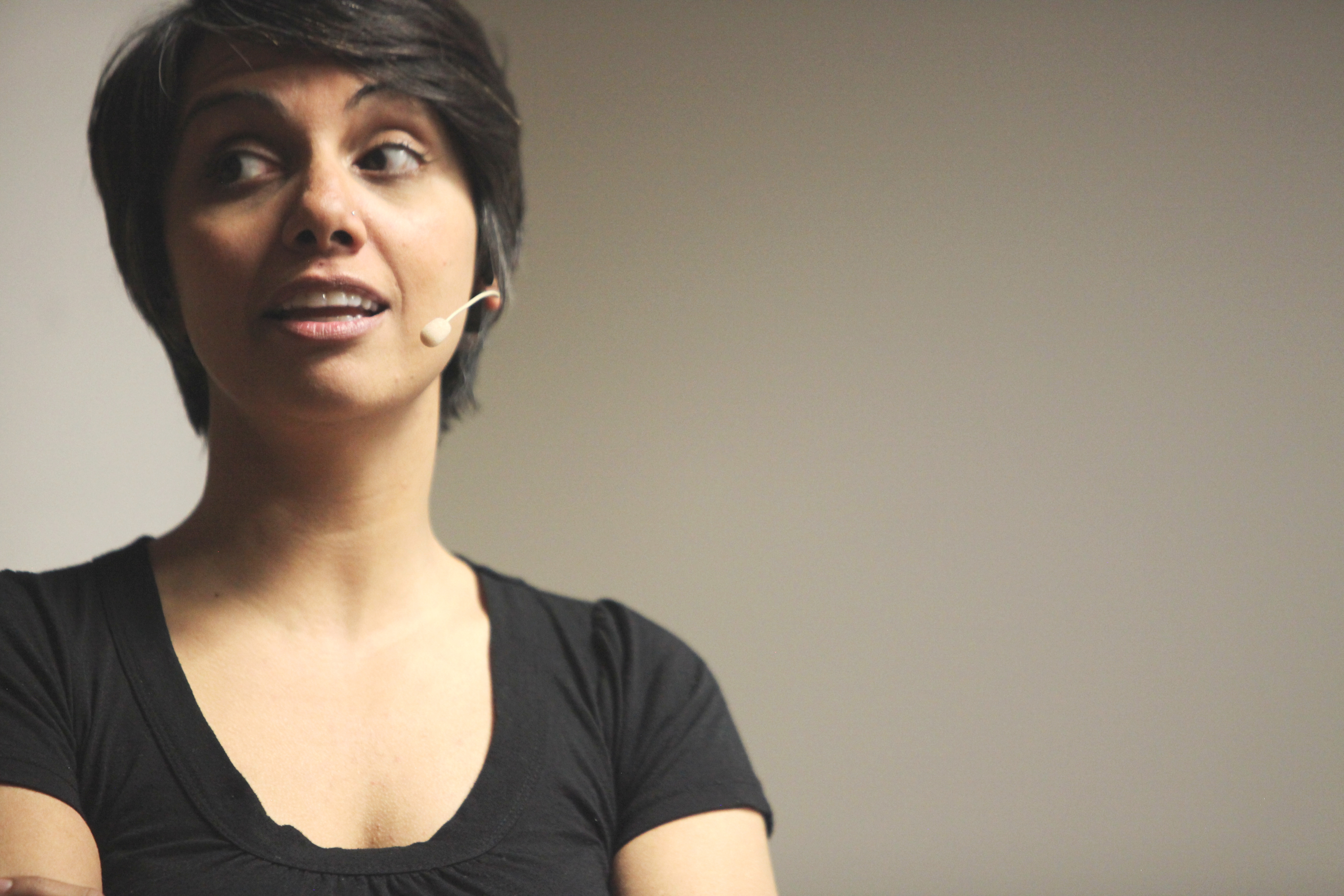
- Mirza in 2011
- Born: Fawzia Mirza
- Education: Chicago-Kent College of Law; Indiana University Bloomington
- Occupations: Filmmaker and writer
- Years active: 2006-Present
- Known for: Writing, Filmmaking, Queer Muslim Advocate
- Notable work: The Queen of My Dreams, Deli Boys, Signature Move, The Red Line, Noor & Layla
- Spouse: Andria Wilson Mirza (m. 2020)
- Website: fawziamirza.com

Fawzia Mirza is a Canadian film and TV director and screenwriter. Her work includes the award-winning feature film The Queen of My Dreams starring Amrit Kaur, the 2017 film Signature Move, and web series Kam Kardashian and Brown Girl Problems. She directed on the 2025 Hulu series Deli Boys.

== Personal life ==
Mirza was born in London, Ontario, Canada, and grew up in Sydney, Nova Scotia. Her parents were born in India, her father in Delhi and her mother in Kanpur. They migrated to Karachi, Pakistan after the 1947 partition of India and eventually moved to Indiana, where Mirza finished high school before relocating to Chicago.

Mirza came out as a Muslim lesbian in 2016, and describes herself as "a lesbian, Muslim, Pakistani, actor, activist, writer, producer, lawyer and creature of passion".

Mirza lives in Los Angeles, California. She is married to film producer and media inclusion advocate Andria Wilson Mirza.

== Film and web series ==
Mirza majored in English and political science at Indiana University in Bloomington, Indiana and then moved to Chicago for law school at Chicago-Kent College of Law. After two and a half years of working as a litigator, she changed professions to become an actor. She has focused on projects relating to the LGBT community, particularly relating to being a queer Muslim woman, "to gain visibility for women and Brown performers, and find space for queer stories".

Her first short film The Queen of My Dreams she co-wrote, co-directed with collaborator Ryan Logan. As a young girl, Fawzia Mirza fell under the spell of Bollywood heroines and their promise of love and feminine perfection. As an adult, she looks back and re-imagines the epic romance in the classic film Aradhana, in a queer light.

Her one-woman show Me, My Mom and Sharmila explores growing up queer and South Asian; in 2015 she performed it at the International Theatre Festival at the National College of Arts in Lahore. Also in 2015, she appeared in Emmy-nominated Her Story, a six-part series on the lives of trans and queer women. Mirza plays Ayesha Ali Trump, a fictional Muslim daughter of Donald Trump, in the mockumentary The Muslim Trump Documentary. She has made a number of award-winning short films including The First Session, Spunkle, Reclaiming Pakistan, The Streets Are Ours, Saya and I Know Her..

In 2016, she announced her film Signature Move (2017) starring Shabana Azmi in the role of her mother. Fawzia produced, starred in and co-wrote with Lisa Donato. The film world premiered at SXSW and won over 14 awards all over the world, including the Jury Prize for US Narrative at Outfest, Best Narrative Film at Columbus International, Best Director and Best Actress at Out San Diego, Audience Award for Best Narrative in Connecticut, and Mirza won a Jury prize at the Canadian South Asian Mosaic Film Festival. The film was inspired by her actual ex-girlfriend and their relationship in the city of Chicago.

She wrote for the CBS show The Red Line executive produced by Ava Duvernay and Greg Berlanti. Her episode marked the first instance of a gay-Muslim romance on network television.

In 2020, her feature screenplay adaptation of The Queen of My Dreams was accepted into the Toronto International Film Festival Writers Studio and Filmmaker Lab, under the working title Me, My Mom & Sharmila. She was one of five women selected to FUSE 2, Paul Feig's writer/director incubator program and will develop a short film with Powderkeg in 2021. In 2021, she was added to Peter Luo's Starlight Media's Stars Collective.

The Queen of My Dreams was nominated for five Canadian Screen Awards, including Best Adapted Screenplay for Fawzia Mirza. It won 2 awards, Best Performance in A Drama (Amrit Kaur) and Best Original Song. Kaur's speech went viral for her support of Palestine.

She was co-winner, with Karen Knox for We Forgot to Break Up, of the DGC Award for Best Direction in a Feature Film in 2024 for The Queen of My Dreams.

In 2026 she entered production on Written in the Stars, a romantic comedy film.

== Filmography ==
Year	Film/Series	Role	Notes
2011	Fair & Lovely	Writer / producer / star	Commercial spoof
2012	The Queen of My Dreams	Co-director / writer / producer / Star	Short Film. later expanded into her 2023 feature debut
2012	Kam Kardashian	Co-Writer / producer / star	Web series
2014	Brown Girl Problems	Writer / producer / star	Web series
2015	The First Session	Writer / producer / star	Short Film
2015	Reclaiming Pakistan	Writer / producer / narrator	Short documentary
2016	The Muslim Trump	Writer / producer / star	Mockumentary
2016	The Streets Are Ours	Writer / producer	Short Doc
2016	Spunkle	Co-Writer / producer / star	Short film
2017	Two Lesbians In Search of Allah	Co-creator / star	Short Doc
2017	Burger King: Anti-Bullying PSA	Subject	PSA / commercial
2017	You Should Know This By Now	Writer / producer / star	Web series
2017	Signature Move	Co-writer / producer / star	Feature film
2019	Saya (Shadow)	Co-director / writer / producer / Star	Short film
2019	I Know Her	Director / writer / producer / star	Short film
2020	Hidden Canyons	Director	Web series
2020	Un Oeuf	Director / 0roducer / star / editor	Short film
2020	Jiyo (Live)	Director / writer / producer	Short film
2021	Noor & Layla	Director / writer	Short film
2021	The Syed Family Xmas Eve Game Night	Director / writer	Short film
2023	The Queen of My Dreams	Director / writer	Feature film
2025	Deli Boys	Director	1 episode
