= Joel Kim Booster =

American actor, comedian, and writer (born 1988)

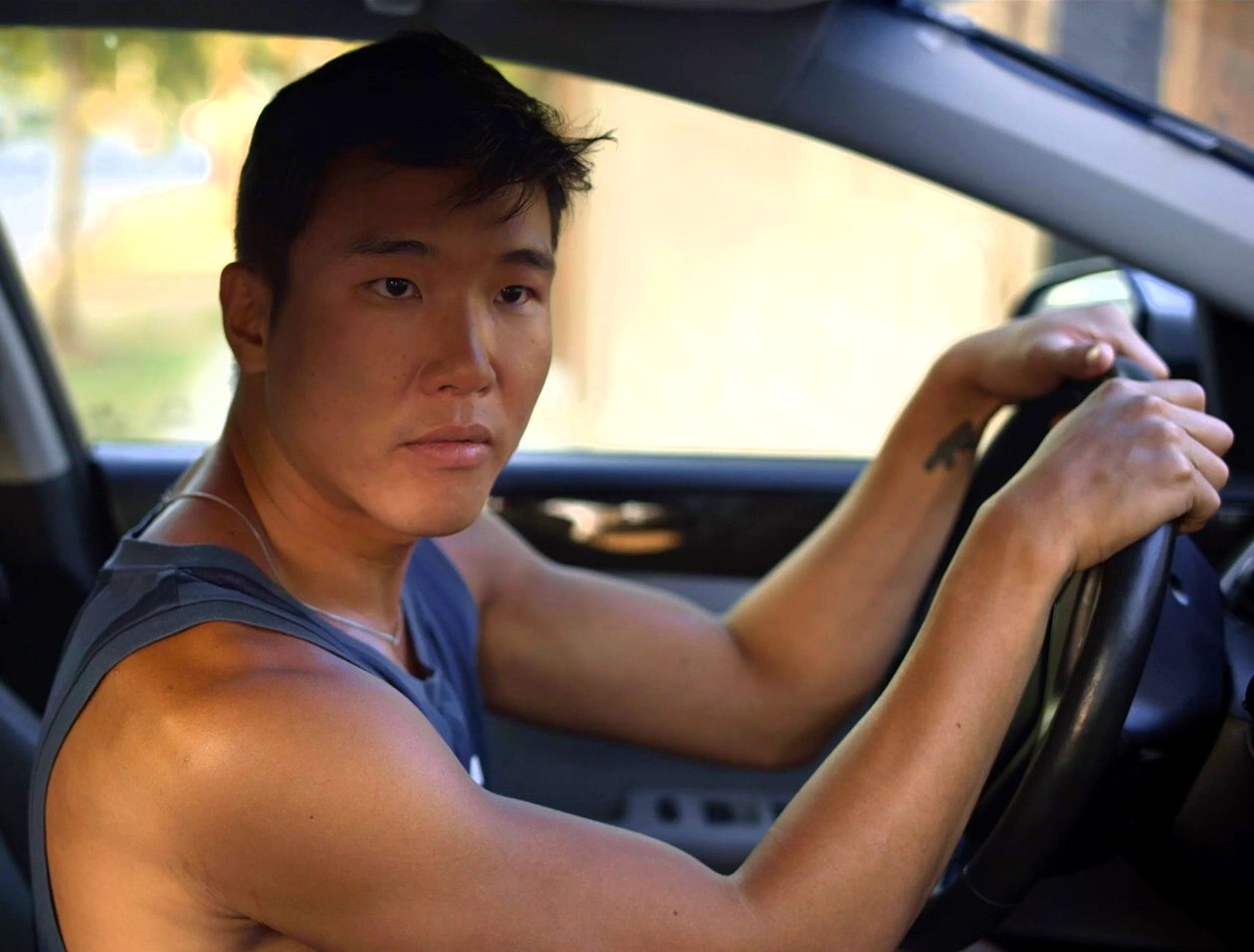
- Booster in 2018
- Born: Kim Joonmin; February 29, 1988 (age 38); Jeju Island, South Korea
- Education: Millikin University
- Occupations: Comedian; writer; actor
- Years active: 2016–present
- Spouse: John-Michael Sudsina (m. 2025)

Joel Alexander Kim Booster (born Kim Joonmin; February 29, 1988) (Korean: 김준민) is an American actor, comedian, producer, and writer. He is known for writing, producing, and starring in the Hulu romantic comedy film Fire Island and his role in the Apple TV comedy series Loot (2022–present), earning two Primetime Emmy Award nominations for the former. He has also co-produced, written, or guest starred for Big Mouth, The Other Two, Shrill, Search Party, and Sunnyside.

== Early and personal life ==
Born Kim Joonmin in Jeju Island, South Korea, Booster was adopted by an American couple as an infant. He was raised in Plainfield, Illinois, in a "conservative, white, Evangelical Christian family" and was initially homeschooled. He went to public school for the first time when he was 16, which he described as his "first time being around non-religious people." He studied theater at Millikin University for his bachelor's degree. He is a member of the Democratic Socialists of America.

Booster is gay and often talks about his sexuality in his stand-up. He explained he knew he was gay from childhood ("before I knew I was Asian") but kept it a secret. During his senior year of high school, his parents found out his orientation by reading his diary where he had described his sexual encounters with other boys. Booster moved out and began to couchsurf until he stayed with a family friend. On July 21, 2020, Booster publicly shared that he has bipolar disorder.

On September 1, 2024, Booster announced on Twitter his engagement to John-Michael Sudsina. The couple married at the Exploratorium in San Francisco on December 30, 2025. In an interview with GQ, Booster revealed that they are in a non-monogamous relationship, but they are not polyamorous and sex outside their marriage is recreational.

== Career ==
=== 2012–2017: Early standup career ===
Living in Chicago, Booster took a job as a copywriter and began to perform in theater and write jokes after work. His standup career began in an unconventional fashion by opening up for plays in Chicago's theater scene. In 2014, Booster moved to New York to pursue a career in comedy. Recognizing the dearth of quality comedic roles in film and television for Asian performers at the time, Booster took inspiration from the careers of Mindy Kaling and Aziz Ansari and decided to focus on establishing his own brand and identity through standup as a means to break into better acting roles later. He quickly found new levels of stand up success after moving to New York, performing a set on Conan in 2016 and filming a 30-minute stand up special for Comedy Central Stand-Up Presents in 2017. On November 3, 2018, he released his debut stand-up album, Model Minority. The material covers racism in the gay community, growing up Asian in a white community, and his own non-adherence to stereotypes about Asian Americans.

=== 2018–2021: Expansion into hosting, comedy writing, acting ===
In 2018, Booster's acting career began to take off. Booster acted with Susan Sarandon in the YouTube original film Viper Club and was cast in Netflix's The Week Of. In 2019, he was cast as a recurring guest character in the critically acclaimed Hulu series Shrill starring Aidy Bryant and based on the titular memoir by Lindy West and co-starred as Jun Ho in the NBC comedy series Sunnyside, which ran for one season. Meanwhile, he started seeing similar success as a comedic writer and producer during this time period, writing for acclaimed comedies Big Mouth, Billy on the Street, and The Other Two.

He is a regular panelist on Wait Wait... Don't Tell Me! on NPR. In 2019, he started the podcast Urgent Care with Joel Kim Booster + Mitra Jouhari with comedian Mitra Jouhari under Earwolf. Booster appeared on the December 8, 2020, episode of The George Lucas Talk Show with fellow guest Eliza Skinner.

=== 2022–present: Hollywood breakout and mainstream success ===
Booster wrote and starred in the 2022 romantic comedy film Fire Island, streaming on Hulu and inspired by Pride and Prejudice. It is one of few mainstream gay films with a predominantly Asian American cast, and co-stars Margaret Cho, Bowen Yang, and Conrad Ricamora. The film received positive reception and was noted for its cinematography, faithfulness to Pride and Prejudice, and depiction of a loving friendship between Howie and Noah (played by Yang and Booster).

In 2022, he released a stand-up special on Netflix called Joel Kim Booster: Psychosexual. Abbey White of The Hollywood Reporter described the special positively: "...Psychosexual offers a hilariously biting deconstruction and reconstruction of Booster's identity onstage; a repudiation not only of himself as a representative or "role model" for his various communities, but an affirmation that as a comedian, his only job is to tell jokes — regardless of whether that speaks to any community at all."

In June 2025, it was announced that Booster would be performing at Belly Laughs, a new comedy and food festival in Los Angeles.

In November 2025, Booster made it to the final round of the "8 Degrees of Jane" episode of Celebrity Weakest Link.

=== Accolades ===
Booster was called a Comic to Watch by Variety and one of Vulture's 20 Comedians You Should and Will Know, and was named a Forbes' 30 Under 30 in Hollywood & Entertainment.

== Filmography ==
=== Film ===
Year	Title	Role	Notes
2018	The Week Of	Airline Attendant	
2018	Viper Club	Robbie	
2022	Unplugging	Phil	
2022	Fire Island	Noah	Also writer and executive producer
2023	Urkel Saves Santa: the Movie	Clerk Gary (voice)	Direct-to-video
2024	Sweethearts	Ethan	
2025	KPop Demon Hunters	Romance Saja, Variety Show Host 1, and Idol Host (voice)	
TBA	Better Life †		Post-production

=== Television ===
Year	Title	Role	Notes
2013–2014	Kam Kardashian	Joel	Web series; also writer
2013–2014	Funemployed	Charlie / Backup Dancer	Web series
2016	Conan	Himself	Stand-up set
2017	Comedy Central Stand-Up Presents	Himself	Stand-up
2018	Comedy Central's Thank You, Goodnight!	Himself	
2019	The Other Two	—N/a	Writer and producer
2019	You're Not a Monster	Phantom of the Opera	Voice
2019	BoJack Horseman	Maude's Ex-Boyfriend	Voice, episode: "The Face of Depression"
2019	Sunnyside	Jun Ho	
2019–2020	Shrill	Tony	Recurring role
2019–2023	Big Mouth	Charles Lu	Voice, recurring role; also producer
2020	Search Party	Peter	
2021	iCarly	Alexavier	
2021	Bob's Burgers	Life Coach Dane	Voice, episode: "The Pumpkinening"
2021	Curb Your Enthusiasm	Hulu Executive No. 1	
2021	Santa Inc.	Jingle Jim	Voice
2022	American Dad!	Geric / Gold Top Nuts Son / Grocery Store Employee	Voice, 2 episodes
2022	Joel Kim Booster: Psychosexual	Himself	Stand-up
2022	Stand Out: An LGBTQ + Celebration	Himself	Stand-up set
2022	Celebrity Jeopardy!	Himself	Contestant
2022	The Great American Baking Show	Himself	Contestant
2022–present	Loot	Nicholas	Main role
2023	Glamorous	Cliff	
2023	Is It Cake?	Himself / Judge	Episode: "That 90's Cake"
2024	RuPaul's Drag Race	Himself / Judge	Episode: "Corporate Queens"
2024	Industry	Frank Wade	Episode: "It"
2025–present	Love Hotel	Himself / Presenter	
2026	It's Florida, Man	Lester	Episode: "Crushed"
2026	Scrubs	Dr. Kevin Park	Recurring role
2026	Dang!	Kevin Lu	Voice, episode: "Hogslut Rodeo"

=== Video games ===
Year	Title	Role	Notes
2026	Cookie Run: Kingdom	Romance Cookie	

== Discography ==
- 2018: Model Minority

== Awards and nominations ==
Year	Association	Work	Category	Result	Ref.
2022	Dorian Awards	—N/a	Wilde Wit Award	Nominated	
2022	Gotham Independent Film Awards	Fire Island	Ensemble Tribute	Won	
2023	GLAAD Media Awards	Fire Island	Outstanding Film – Streaming or TV	Won	
2023	Independent Spirit Awards	Fire Island	Best First Screenplay	Nominated	
2023	Producers Guild of America Awards	Fire Island	Outstanding Producer of Streamed or Televised Motion Pictures	Nominated	
2023	Primetime Emmy	Fire Island	Outstanding Television Movie	Nominated	
2023	Primetime Emmy	Fire Island	Outstanding Writing for a Limited or Anthology Series or Movie	Nominated	

== See also ==
- Koreans in New York City
- LGBT culture in New York City
- List of LGBT people from New York City
