= Patrick W. Welch =

English artist (1965–2008)

- Born: Patrick W. Welch; 1 July 1965 Billericay, England, U.K.
- Died: 16 October 2008 (aged 43) U.S.
- Areas: Painter, illustrator, cartoonist
- Notable works: The Micromentalists

Patrick W. Welch (1 July 1965 – 16 October 2008) was an English painter, illustrator, cartoonist, and art professor who lived in Chicago, Illinois, United States. He billed himself as "Patrick W. Welch, Painter of Hate," a spoof/homage to Thomas Kinkade, Painter of Light.

== Career ==
Welch was born in Billericay, England, and attended state schools. He earned a BA in graphic design from the Norwich School of Art in 1987 and an MA in illustration from the Royal College of Art in 1991. In 1993 Welch gained cult status for "The Hippogryph Files," a series of graphic short stories that appeared in The Baffler, Pulse!, and numerous comics anthologies, as well as being printed as postcards. Welch shared a London studio with illustrator Mikey Georgeson, better known as The Vessel from the indie-pop band David Devant & His Spirit Wife.

In 1995 Welch moved to the United States with his American wife, Carrie Golus. During the 1990s Welch and Golus co-edited a short-lived comics anthology, Thurn & Taxis.

Welch taught sequential art at Savannah College of Art and Design in Savannah, Georgia, from 1995 to 1998. In 1998 Welch moved to Chicago, where he became a professor of media arts and animation at the Illinois Institute of Art – Chicago. Beginning in 1998, Welch collaborated with Golus on a series of non-fiction political/social comics for the alternative weekly newspaper Newcity as well as a comic strip, "Alternator," which ran in The Stranger, UR Chicago, and other alternative weeklies.

Beginning in 2001, Welch began to gain recognition for his painting. His solo painting exhibitions at Gescheidle Gallery in Chicago, where he was represented from 2002 until his death in 2008, included Revenge: The Miniature Hate Paintings of Patrick W. Welch (2002), Patrick W. Welch versus The Village of Schaumburg: Miniature Redemption Paintings (2004), Art Destroys: More Miniature Hate Paintings and Mini-Insult Blocks from Patrick W. Welch (2005), and I now know more than you ever will (2008), which was his final exhibition.

Welch's paintings were often autobiographical, combining violent subject matter with black humour. He is perhaps best known for his "Miniature Hate Paintings," which evoke a strange combination of childhood nightmare and adult neurosis, drawing on references from contemporary fine art, comic books, and science fiction. His "Miniature Insult Blocks," painted on 1 in × 2 in (25 mm × 51 mm) blocks of wood, detailed English playground childhood insults in, according to Welch's description, "the saccahrine colours of boiled sweets."

Commenting in Chicago's Newcity, critic Michael Workman writes:

Welch has been on a ride into the infinite regress of his distaste for human existence for years now, and it's a testament to his [obturation] that he's managed to keep lively each self-reference as the fecal discharge of famous mainstream artists. Most successful, however, are the grid of even tinier acrylic panels, "Mini Insult Blocks" as he calls them, each emblazoned with an insulting word such as plonker or bumbandit. Every time I encounter these paintings, it's never the frothy sense of loathing that wins me over, but the undeniable, laugh-out-loud funny humor of them all, an aspect of the work that no doubt has the capacity to elevate them even further into that stratosphere of the imaginary world beyond.

== Sporting career ==
Welch learned football and played from 1991 until 1995 as a midfielder. After moving to the USA he did not resume playing.

== Animation instructor ==
As a teacher at the Illinois Institute of Art - Chicago, Welch taught in the Animation department. Classes he taught included Acting for Animation, Story-boarding, Drawing and Characterization, Character Design, Advanced Life Drawing (occasionally) and Portfolio classes. Welch taught alongside Lindsay Grace at the school.

Part of his popularity may have been due to his delightfully morose personality quirks. He was known for his self-deprecating humor and detached, bleak outlook on the world, while maintaining a generally positive disposition in spite of it. While generally portraying himself as a pessimist in regard to society at large, he was undeniably an optimist in regard to the ability and potential of his students. Welch was in the habit of indicating an imminent break to the students attending his lectures with the words "Come on everyone, these cigarettes are not going to smoke themselves".

== Micromentalists ==
In 2006, Welch started an art movement collectively known as the Micromentalists. The general philosophy of the group was that art need not be "monumental" in scale to be important, and has been described as "pseudo-Marxist". Welch's purpose in putting together the Micromentalists was to start an art movement based on this philosophy. Founding members included artists Bill Drummond, Steve Keene, Paul Nudd, James J. Peterson, and Eric Doeringer.

The group became known not only for its premise of small art, but also for its commercial practice of selling art at lower prices, adjusted for the income of the buyer. Their first shows were mentioned in Chicago and national art media for these reasons and for the participation of notable artists such as Drummond and Keene.

== Personal life and death ==
Welch died at the age of 43 in 2008, "leaving behind his wife Carrie Golus, and twin 5-year-old sons, Ben & Alex."

== Publications and reviews ==
=== 2007 ===
- New American Paintings. Boston, MA: Open Studios Press. 2007.
- Stabler, Bert (23 March 2007). "Giving it all away". Chicago Reader. Archived from the original on 29 September 2007.
- Waxman, Lori (13 March 2007). "The Micromentalists". Artforum.
- Austin, Jake (2007). "Let's Get Small". Chicago Journal.
- Kelly, Dan (21 February 2007). "Micromentalism and Patrick Welch". SWEET HOME CHICAGO. Gapers Block.
- Kaufman, Justin (23 September 2007). "Hello Beautiful!". WBEZ. Chicago. Archived from the original on 20 April 2008.

=== 2005 ===
- Workman, Michael (12 December 2005). "Eye Exam: Border Patrol". Art. Newcity. Archived from the original on 1 July 2006.
- The Basil H. Alkazzi Foundation: a celebration of twenty years association between the Foundation and the Royal College of Art. Royal College of Art Press. 2005. pp. 60–61 (illustrations).

=== 2004 ===
- Sill, Robert (2004). think small!. Illinois State Museum Society (catalogue). pp. 17, 64 (illustration p. 52).

=== 2002 ===
- Camper, Fred (19 September 2002). "Hated/Liberated". Chicago Reader. p. Section 1, p. 26. Archived from the original on 15 October 2012.
- Sanders, Seth (13 September 2002). "An Artist's Revenge". Chicago Reader. p. section 1, p. 9.
- New American Paintings. Boston, MA: Open Studios Press. 2002.
- Smith, Ulysses (18 January 2002). "Interview with Patrick W. Welch". Chicago Reader. p. Section 1, p. 30.

=== 2001 ===
- Keller, Julia (27 December 2001). "9/11 adds new urgency to strips". Tempo. Chicago Tribune. p. Section 5.
- Crouse, Charity (17 December 2001). "Exhibit Explores America's Fascination with Guns". Street Scene. Streetwise.
- Hawkins, Margaret (15 June 2001). "Gallery Glance". Chicago Sun-Times. p. Section N5.
- Keller, Julia (20 June 2001). "Sketchy Reports". Tempo. Chicago Tribune. p. Section 5, pp. 8–9.
- Green, Nick (June 2001). "For the Love of Comics". Chicago Social. p. 30.

=== 2000 ===
- Mason, Robert (2000). "A Digital Dolly?". Norwich, England: Norwich School of Art and Design Press. pp. 44–45, 54 (illustration p. 22).

=== 1998 ===
- Vengas, Margarita. "[Review/interview with illustration]". Georgia Guardian. p. 21 May 1998.
