= Aftermath (2021 film) =

2021 film by Peter Winther

- Film poster
- Directed by: Peter Winther
- Written by: Dakota Gorman
- Story by: Peter Winther; Dakota Gorman
- Produced by: James Andrew Felts; Lars Winther; Peter Winther; Rick Sasner
- Starring: Ashley Greene; Shawn Ashmore; Britt Baron; Sharif Atkins
- Cinematography: Tom Camarda
- Edited by: Robin Gonsalves
- Music by: Sacha Chaban
- Distributed by: Quiver Distribution
- Release date: August 4, 2021 (Netflix)
- Running time: 114 minutes
- Country: United States
- Language: English

Aftermath is a 2021 American horror film directed by Peter Winther, starring Ashley Greene and Shawn Ashmore. It was released on August 4 on Netflix.

== Plot ==
A young couple struggling to stay together are offered an amazing deal on a home with a questionable past that would normally be beyond their means. In a final attempt to start fresh as a couple, they take the deal.

== Cast ==
- Ashley Greene as Natalie Dadich
- Shawn Ashmore as Kevin Dadich
- Sharif Atkins as Officer Richardson
- Jason Liles as Otto
- Britt Baron as Dani
- Diana Hopper as Avery
- Jamie Kaler as Dave
- Travis Coles as Garrett
- Susan Walters as Farrah
- Ross McCall as Nick Scott
- Paula Garcés as Claudia
- Sandra Prosper as Anne Levin
- Juliette Jeffers as Dr. Sasner

== Reception ==
=== Critical response ===
According to review aggregation site Rotten Tomatoes, it has an audience rating of 61%. Reviews read such as; "My first time rating a movie because I had to let someone know how much I hated it. First of, the esthetic is awful. The color grading of this "movie", if I can even call it that, is terrible. Pause at any given time, and it won't look like a scene from a movie, but rather a scene from an ad for Mr. Clean or something", and "They have somehow managed to make something even more preposterous than yet another ghost story... and that's not a compliment" and "...struggles to define what it sets out to be, and the mess of unnecessary plot lines only adds to the confusion."
