= Andrea Londo =

American actress

- Occupation: Actress
- Years active: 2014–present

Andrea Londo is an American actress. She is known for portraying Maria Salazar in Narcos Season 3.

== Filmography ==
Film roles
Year	Title	Role	Notes
2018	Superfly	Cynthia	
2019	Ice Cream in the Cupboard	Young Carmen	
2020	Dreaming Grand Avenue	Maggie	
2021	The Free Fall	Sara	
2022	Good Egg	Bridget	

Television roles
Year	Title	Role	Notes
2015	Catfish: The TV Show	Jacqueline	Catfish: Untold Stories Part 6
2016	Faking It	Edie	Episode: "Ex - Posed"
2017	Criminal Minds: Beyond Borders	Canela	Episode: "The Devil's Breath"
2017	Narcos	Maria Salazar	Main role (season 3)
2019	Snowfall	Ximena	1 episode
2020	Tommy	Maria De La Puerta	1 episode
2021	Bite Size Halloween	Alma	1 episode
2022	The Winchesters	Betty Donelan	4 episodes
2024	Matlock	Simone	Recurring
