= Dreaming Grand Avenue =

- Directed by: Hugh Schulze
- Written by: Hugh Schulze
- Produced by: Brian Hieggelke; Jan Hieggelke
- Starring: Jackson Rathbone; Andrea Londo; Wendy Robie; Tony Fitzpatrick
- Cinematography: Christopher Rejano
- Edited by: Joe Rabig
- Music by: Seth Boustead
- Production company: Chicago Film Project
- Release date: 23 September 2020
- Running time: 99 minutes
- Country: United States
- Language: English

Dreaming Grand Avenue is a 2020 American fantasy drama film directed by Hugh Schulze, starring Jackson Rathbone, Andrea Londo, Wendy Robie and Tony Fitzpatrick.

== Cast ==
- Jackson Rathbone as Jimmy
- Andrea Londo as Maggie
- Wendy Robie as Andromeda
- Tony Fitzpatrick as Jack Yancy
- Tiffany Bedwell as Dr. Emily Wandervogel
- Bryce Gangel as Amy
- Tony Castillo as Ernesto
- Troy West as Walt Whitman
- Abby Pierce as Audra

== Release ==
The film premiered at the ChiTown Movies Drive-in on 23 September 2020.

== Reception ==
Richard Roeper of Chicago Sun-Times rated the film 3.5 stars out of 4 called the film a "small but ambitious and metaphysical and deeply poetic gem with big ideas, stunningly original visuals of Chicago — and beautifully honed performances from a cast that includes talented young actors and some veteran performers who bring a grounded, real-world, seen-it-all wisdom to their respective and somewhat mystical roles." Dann Gire of the Daily Herald rated the film 3 stars out of 4 and wrote that the film "skirts across genres with the reliable grace of an el train hitting every station stop on its way through Chicago."

Peter Martin of ScreenAnarchy praised the performances of Rathbone and Londo, writing that they "avoid overdramatizing their roles" and portray their characters in an " empathetic light". He also praised the characters they portray as being "likeable". Robert Daniels of RogerEbert.com rated the film 2 stars out of 4 and wrote that the film "stumbles to an unearned finish" and contains several "unnecessary" ingredients to a "narrative concoction brimming to overflow."
