= Gold Top Nuts =

- American Dad! episode
- Episode no.: Season 19; Episode 10
- Directed by: Jennifer Graves
- Written by: Brett Cawley; Robert Maitia
- Production code: GAJN09
- Original air date: September 12, 2022
- Running time: 21 minutes

Guest appearances
- Tom Bodett as Gold Top Nuts Boss; Joel Kim Booster as Gold Top Nuts Son / Grocery Store Employee; Yvette Nicole Brown as Announcer; Parker Deay as Parker; John Early as Gold Top Nuts Brother; Josh Fadem as Tom; Julie Nathanson as Gold Top Nuts Wife; Natalie Palamides as Tiffany; June Diane Raphael as Suze; Courtenay Taylor as Airplane Passenger; Gary Anthony Williams as Pilot

Episode chronology
← Previous "The Curious Case of the Old Hole"	Next → "The Three Fs"
- American Dad! season 19

"Gold Top Nuts" is the tenth episode of the nineteenth season of the American animated television series American Dad!, and the 332nd episode of the series overall. Written by Brett Cawley and Robert Maitia and directed by Jennifer Graves, it was first broadcast on TBS in the United States on September 12, 2022.

The episode was viewed by 390,000 viewers according to Nielsen ratings. The episode received acclaim upon release, and is often considered by critics to be one of the best American Dad! episodes, being featured in several critics' lists for the series' finest episodes.

== Plot ==
"Before the island, we were fighting so much. We thought we couldn't forgive each other because we couldn't forget. But it turns out, if you forget, then there can be no act of forgiveness. The answer, as much as we've tried to deny it, as embarrassing and strange as it may be, was on that tape. If we can't fully forgive and we can't fully forget, then all we can do is offer each other more kindness. We have to offer each other… the best."

— Francine Smith (voiced by Wendy Schaal), "Gold Top Nuts"

After a disastrous low-cost vacation, the Smiths are furiously arguing with each other on their flight home. A plane crash strands them on a deserted island and they find refuge in a lighthouse.

After a time, they lose their memories, struggle to rebuild their personalities and identities, and repeatedly watch a recorded television commercial for Gold Top Nuts in a bid to learn about the outside world. They adopt new names and vocabulary based on the world of the commercial. Deciding that the stars in the sky are other lighthouses, the Smiths set out to reach them in a boat.

The Smiths arrive at a restaurant and then regain their memories. It emerges that the family's loss of memory was caused by magnetic bedrock under the island. They become a figure of ridicule once their story becomes known, and appear on a morning TV show where they are laughed at by the host and audience.

Struggling to return to their normal lives, the family buy a can of Gold Top Nuts and talk about their experience, resolving to try and love each other more.

== Production ==
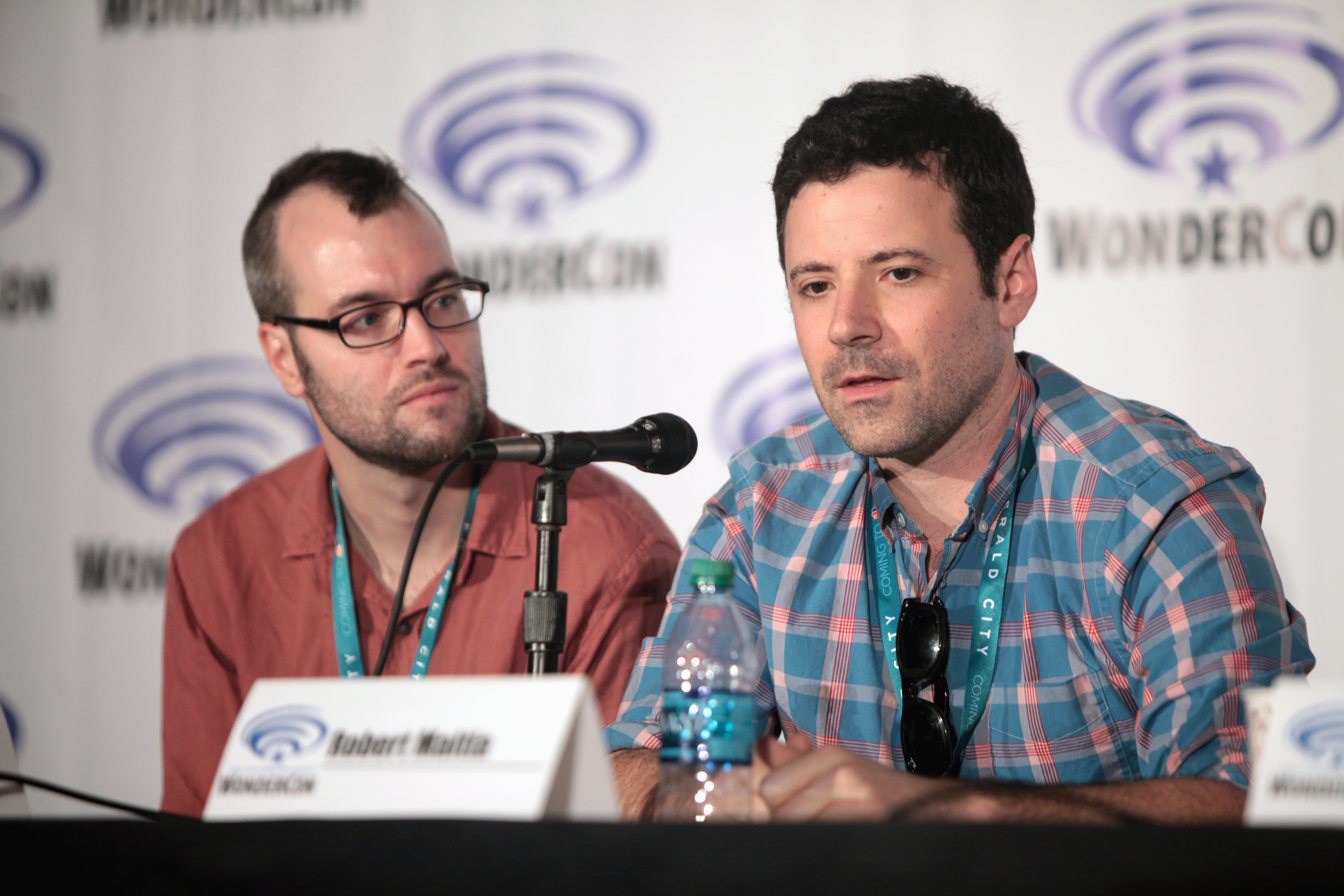
The episode was written by Brett Cawley and Robert Maitia (pictured).

The episode was directed by Jennifer Graves and written by Brett Cawley and Robert Maitia. This duo had written many other episodes of American Dad!, including the acclaimed "The Two Hundred."

== Release and reception ==
Den of Geek placed it #4 in a list of the 25 best American Dad! episodes, saying that "'Gold Top Nuts' turns into an enlightening deconstruction of communication and community that’s akin to something like The Gods Must Be Crazy."

Bubbleblabber reviewer Daniel Kurland gave "Gold Top Nuts" 9.5/10, calling it "a Brechtian analysis of the self that may fall flat for many viewers, but it’s an episode that’s unlike any other and a testament to what stands American Dad! apart from its animated peers."
