= Melanie Liburd =

British actress

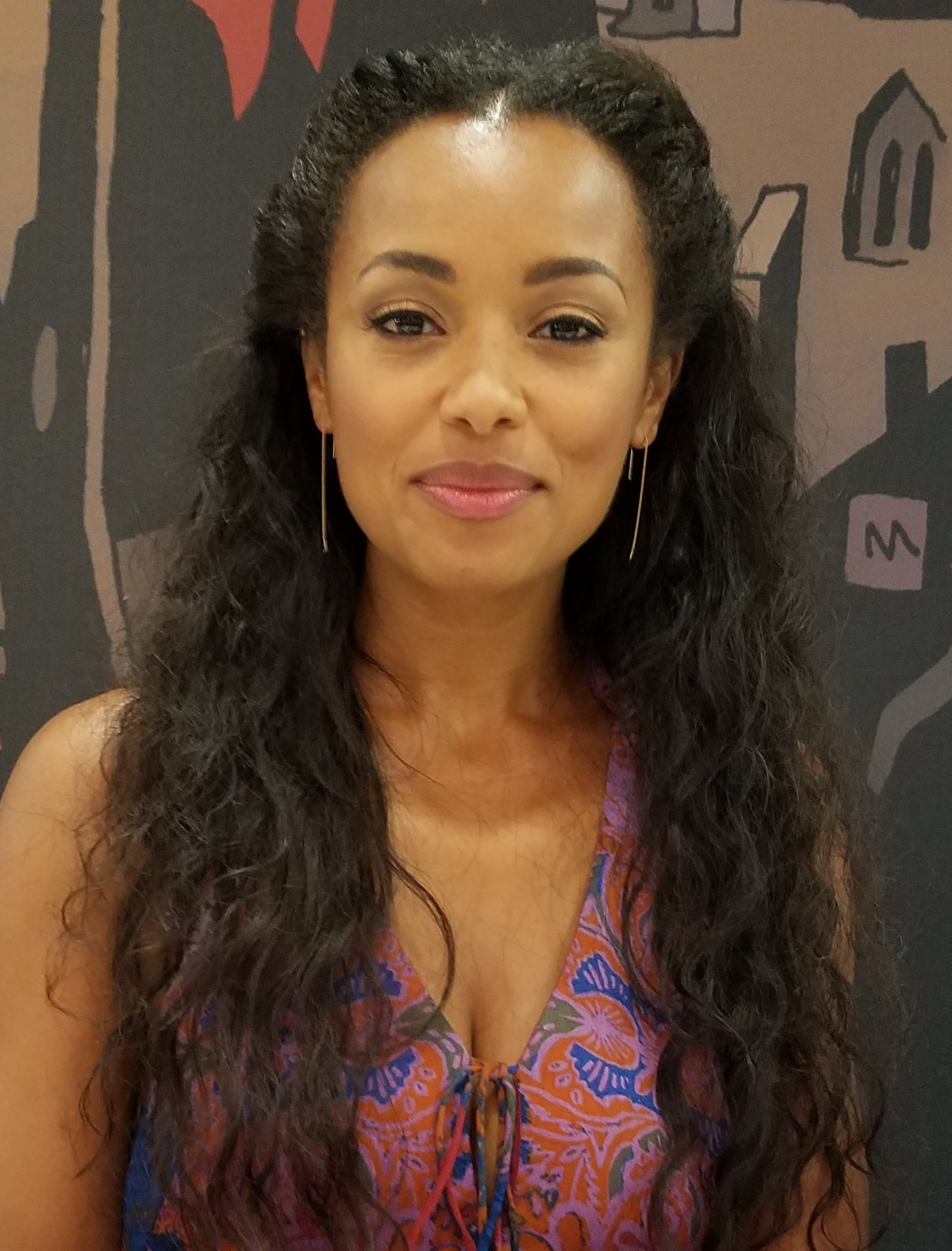
- Liburd at San Diego Comic-Con in 2016
- Born: 1987 or 1988 (age 38–39); Hertfordshire, UK
- Occupation: Actress
- Years active: 2012–present

Melanie Liburd is an English actress. She is known for her roles in This Is Us (2018–2021), Power Book II: Ghost (2020–2022), Perpetrator (2023), and her video game role debut in Alan Wake 2 (2023).

== Early life ==
Liburd was born to an English mother and a Kittian father and grew up in Hertfordshire. She graduated with a Bachelor of Arts (BA) in Fashion Design. She later trained at Identity School of Acting.

== Career ==
Liburd made her television debut in 2012 episodes of the Sky One series Strike Back. That same year, she was cast in a comedy pilot.

In 2016, Liburd appeared as the red priestess in "No One", an episode of the sixth season of the series Game of Thrones. She was cast in the psychological thriller television series Gypsy in late 2016.

From 2018 to 2019, Liburd portrayed Zoe in This Is Us. From 2020 to 2022, she portrayed Carrie Milgram in Power Book II: Ghost. In 2023, Liburd provided the voice and motion capture for Saga Anderson in the Remedy Entertainment video game Alan Wake 2.

== Filmography ==
=== Films ===
Year	Title	Role	Notes
2015	How Sarah Got Her Wings	Amanda	aka A Mission for Christmas
2015	Runaway Island	Kira Geoffries	TV movie
2018	Brian Banks	Karina Cooper	
2023	Perpetrator	Jean	
2024	Bad Boys: Ride or Die	Christine	

=== TV Series ===
Year	Title	Role	Notes
2012	Strike Back	Asmara	Episodes: "Vengeance, Part 1" and "Part 2"
2014	Dracula	Ladybird	Episode: "Come to Die"
2014	Stalker	Lori Carter	Episode: "Pilot"
2014	CSI: Crime Scene Investigation	Natalie Barrow / The Hornet	Episode: "Dead Rails"
2015	The Grinder	Ivy Dexter	2 episodes
2016	Game of Thrones	Red Priestess	Episode: "No One"
2016–2017	Dark Matter	Nyx Harper	13 episodes
2017	Gypsy	Alexis	Main role (10 episodes)
2018–2021	This Is Us	Zoe Baker	21 episodes
2020	Make It Work!	Herself	Television special
2020–2022	Power Book II: Ghost	Caridad "Carrie" Milgram	18 episodes
2023	The Idol	Jenna	TV series; recurring role
2025	High Potential	Tiana Johnson	Episode: "The RAMs"

=== Video games ===
Year	Title	Role	Notes
2023	Alan Wake 2	Saga Anderson	Voice and motion capture; One of two playable protagonists

== Awards and nominations ==
Year	Award	Category	Nominated work	Result	Ref.
2023	The Game Awards	Best Performance	Alan Wake 2	Nominated	
2024	New York Game Awards	Great White Way Award for Best Acting in a Game	Alan Wake 2	Won	
2024	D.I.C.E. Awards	Outstanding Achievement in Character	Alan Wake 2	Nominated	
2024	British Academy Games Awards	Performer in a Leading Role	Alan Wake 2	Longlisted	
