= Jennifer Reeder =

American screenwriter

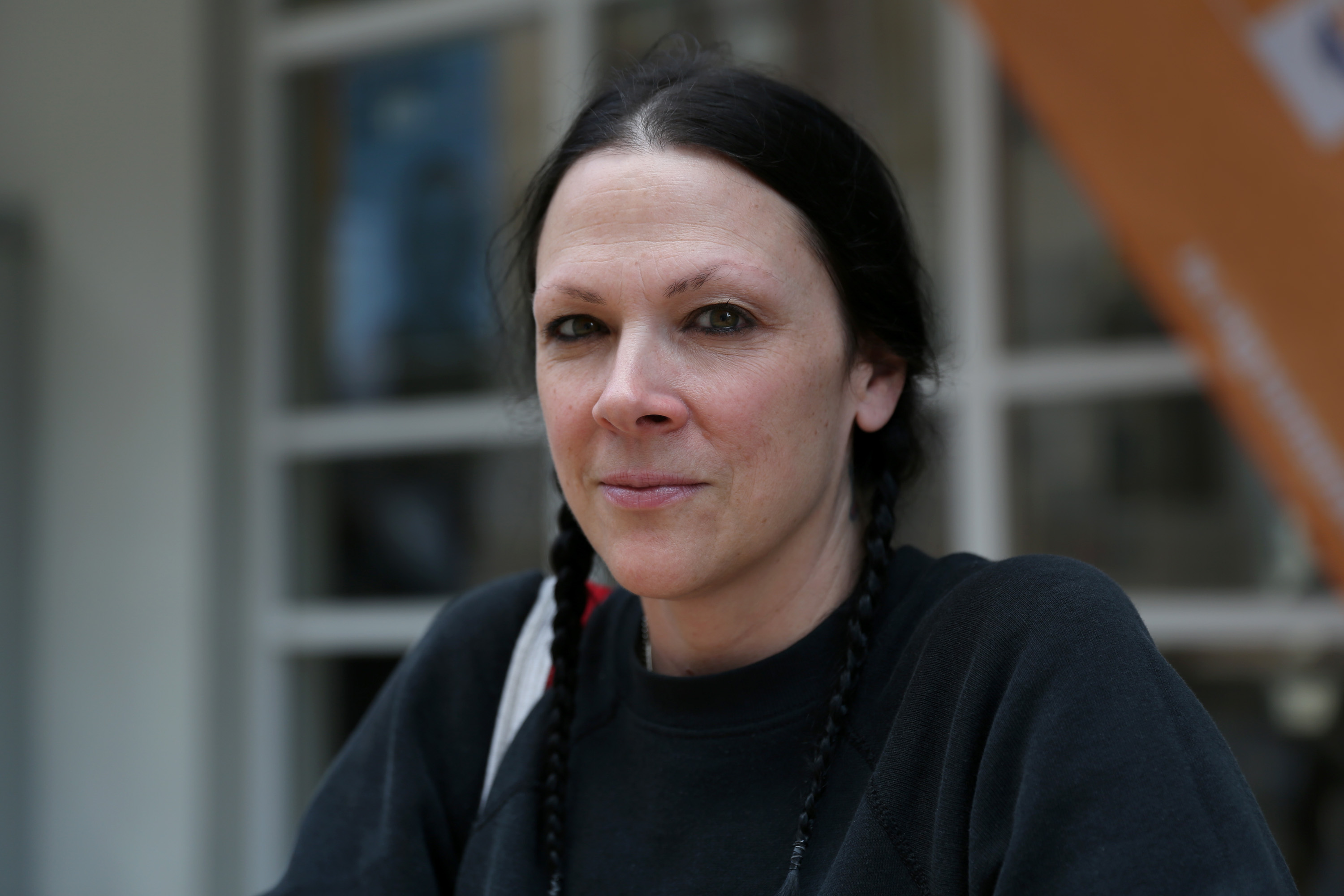
Jennifer Reeder (VIS 2015)

Jennifer Reeder (born 1971, Ohio) is an American artist, filmmaker, and screenwriter. Her short film A Million Miles Away (2014) was nominated for a Tiger Award for Short Films at the International Film Festival Rotterdam and screened at the 2015 Sundance Film Festival in the U.S. Short Narrative Films category. In 2003, she had a solo screening at Moderna Museet in Stockholm, Sweden. She received a Rockefeller Grant for New Media in 2002 and a Creative Capital grant in 2015 to support the production of her first experimental feature-length film, Knives and Skin. She won a 2018–19 SFFILM Rainin Grant for scriptwriting, and was the 2019 recipient of the Alpert Film Award residency at the MacDowell Colony. In 2021, she was awarded a United States Artists (USA) Fellowship.

Reeder attracted notice early in her career for her performance and video work as "White Trash Girl," a fictional identity through which the artist explored lower-income white culture in the United States. Interviewed by writer and Northwestern University professor Laura Kipnis for the anthology White Trash: Race and Class in America, Reeder said that white trash "describes a certain esthetic, but I think it's also a socioeconomic situation, and a way of perceiving the world around you and your own place in the world." Her more recent films explore the lives of adolescent girls and their use of music, slang, and fashion to express their identities and aspects of their emotional world.

Her films have screened at the Whitney Biennial; The New York Video Festival; Kunsthalle Exnergasse in Vienna, Austria; the Gene Siskel Film Center; the Yerba Buena Center for the Arts in San Francisco; P.S.1 Contemporary Art Center; the Wexner Center for the Arts; the Chicago Underground Film Festival; the Criterion Channel; and the 48th International Venice Biennial.

Reeder currently teaches in the School of Art and Art History at the University of Illinois, Chicago and holds the position of Associate Professor Moving Image. She is the founder of the social justice group Tracers Book Club, which focuses on feminist issues. Reeder received an MFA from The School of the Art Institute of Chicago in 1996 and was represented by the Andrew Rafacz Gallery in Chicago, Illinois.

== Film ==
- White Trash Girl, 1995
- The Heart and Other Small Shapes, 2006
- Claim, 2007 (video short)
- Accidents at Home and How They Happen, 2008
- Seven Songs About Thunder, 2010
- Tears Cannot Restore Her; Therefore I Weep, 2010
- And I Will Rise If Only to Hold You Down, 2011
- Girls Love Horses, 2013
- A Million Miles Away, 2014
- Crystal Lake, 2015
- Blood Below the Skin, 2015
- Signature Move, 2017
- All Small Bodies, 2017
- Shuvit, 2017
- Knives and Skin, 2019
- V/H/S/94, (segment Holy Hell), 2021
- Night's End, 2022
- Perpetrator (2023)

== See also ==
- List of female film and television directors
- List of LGBT-related films directed by women
