= Hugh Schulze =

American film director

Hugh Schulze is a writer/director whose second feature, Dreaming Grand Avenue (2020), was hailed by Richard Roeper of the Chicago Sun Times as "a small but ambitious and metaphysical and deeply poetic (in more ways than one) gem with big ideas, stunningly original visuals of Chicago — and beautifully honed performances." Dann Gire of the Chicago Daily Herald wrote: "poetic Dreaming Grand Avenue skirts across genres with the reliable grace of an el train hitting every station stop on its way through Chicago."

His first feature film CASS, a family drama set in Detroit, was named Best Film at the San Diego International Black Film Festival and received an Indie Spirit Special Recognition Award at the Boston International Film Festival] in 2013. His earlier short films, Arc of a Bird (2008) and Credits (2009) have also received more than a dozen film festival awards. His film script for Dressing Up received the Best Feature/Comedy Award at the International Family Film Festival in 2010.

Schulze is co-author with Norman Sartorius of the non-fiction book, Reducing the Stigma of Mental Illness, published by Cambridge University Press (2005), which reviewers have called an "enlightening resource" and "a major contribution to efforts to improve the mental health of individuals and populations."

His short story, Nativity Scene with Action Figures, was nominated for a Pushcart Prize in 2000.

His global communications company, c|change, is headquartered in Chicago and the recipient of numerous design and video awards. The company's clients have included: the World Psychiatric Association, the Association for the Improvement of Mental Health Programmes, Alzheimer's Association, Chicago Dryer, Shoreline Sightseeing, and Accenture.

== Education ==
Born in Detroit, Michigan, Schulze attended the University of Michigan, pursuing pre-med coursework. He switched his focus to writing and graduated with a BA from Michigan State University. His post-graduate studies include an MA in theology from Catholic Theological Union.
