= Nate Lee (author) =

- Born: 1956 (age 69–70)
- Education: Andover
- Alma mater: Tulane
- Occupation: writer

Nate Lee is an American author and former senior editor at Chicago's Newcity weekly magazine who advocated passionately for live theater. At Newcity, Lee wrote features, a weekly column called Urbanitie, theatre and film reviews as well as stories on architecture and historic preservation, and at one point wrote a book which turned into a musical comedy revue entitled Speak of the Twenties. Working with publishers Brian and Jan Hieggelke, he attracted top writers to write for Newcity including top theater critics who became prominent at other publications later, including Chris Jones of the Chicago Tribune and Rohan Preston of the Minneapolis Star-Tribune. He wrote numerous books published by Abingdon Press and reviews for websites. Lee attended Phillips Academy in Andover and graduated in 1974.

== Publications ==
- Words From the Cross and 5 Other Dramas for Tweens, by Nate Lee (Paperback) 2010
- What a Story!: And Five Other Dramas for Tweens, by Nate Lee (Paperback) 2007
- Don't Miss the Bus and five Other Dramas for Tweens, by Nate Lee, published by Abingdon Press (2006) ISBN 978-0-687-33098-0
- I'll Be Right Back And 5 Other Dramas for Tweens, by Nate Lee
- What's The Score: And 5 Other Drams For Teens (Paperback)
- Trouble in the Temple And Five Other Dramas for Tweens (Paperback)
- Sleep On It!: And 5 Other Dramas for Tweens, by Nate Lee (Hardcover), Abingdon Press, (2007) ISBN 978-0-687-49178-0
- Joy in the Morning: Easy Dramas, Speeches, and Recitations for Children (Paperback)
- Gift of Christmas Presence (Paperback)
- The Invitation: And 5 Other Dramas for Tweens, by Nate Lee
