= Casimere Jollette =

Actress, Dancer, Model

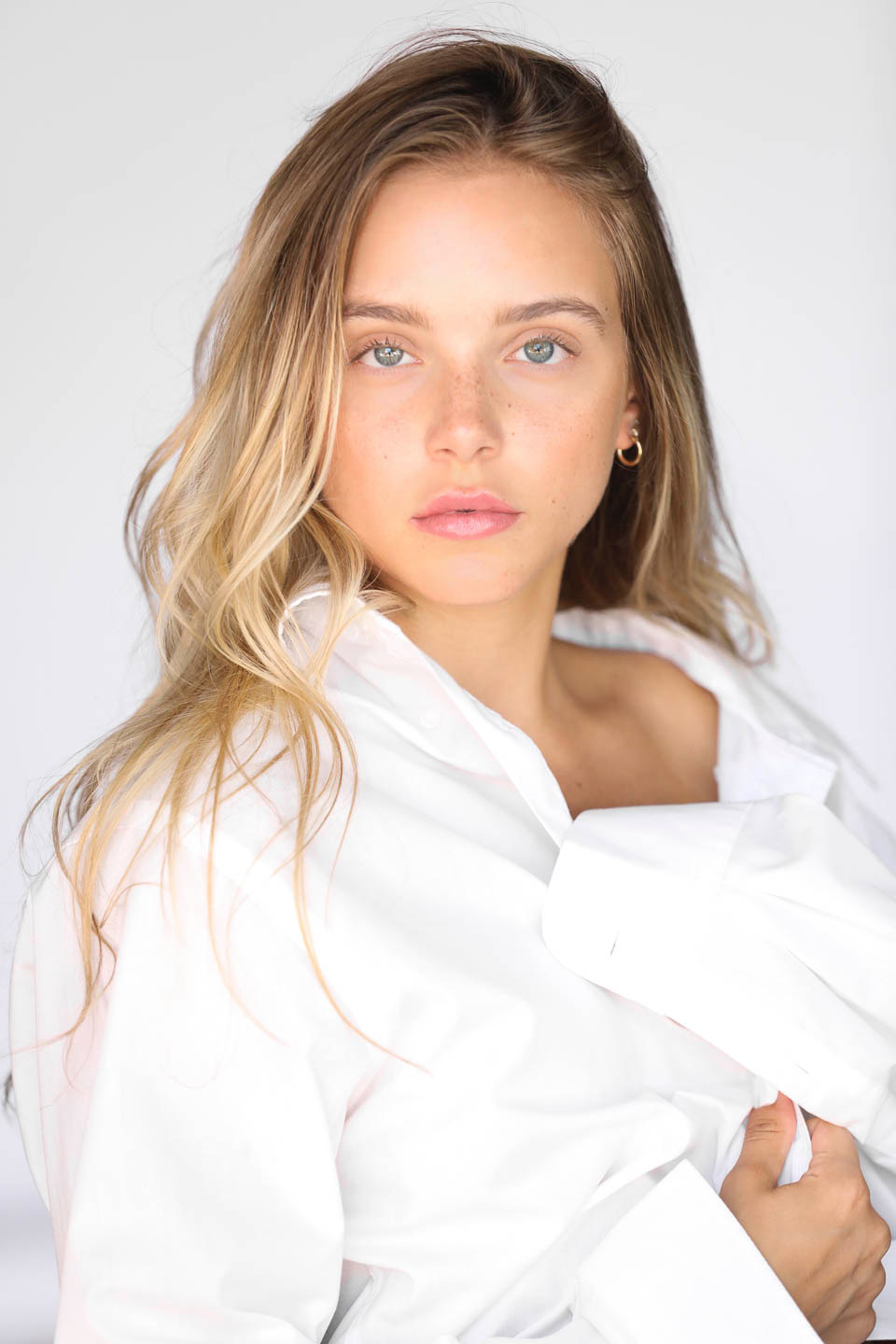
- Born: March 26, 1996 (age 30); Chicago, Illinois
- Notable credits: F.R.E.D.I.; Tiny Pretty Things; Guidance

Casimere Jollette (born March 26, 1996) is an American actress, dancer, and model. She is known for her role as Bette Whitlaw in the Netflix original series Tiny Pretty Things (2020).

Other works include the Shudder streaming service original movie Perpetrator and the AMC series Dark Winds.

== Early life and education ==
Jollette was born and raised in Chicago, Illinois. Jollette is of French, Lithuanian, and Italian descent. Her father, Ralph, is an engineer and entrepreneur. Her mother Carolyn, a former Chicago Honey Bears cheerleader, is an interior designer and author. Her brother, Ralphie, is a classical pianist who works in Los Angeles in the music industry.

Jollette began dancing at the age of three and began training in ballet at the age of twelve, studying under Sherry Moray and attending the prestigious Joffrey Ballet in Chicago and the American Ballet Theatre in New York City. She was homeschooled due to her intensive ballet schedule. Jollette began her modeling career at the age of seven, represented by Ford Models. Her first magazine cover was the 2007 holiday edition of American Girl.

At 18, Jollette moved to Los Angeles to pursue her acting career.

== Career ==
Jollette has made guest appearances in such television shows as Chicago P.D., Dirty John, This Is Us, Dimension 404 and Code Black. In 2015 she appeared in all six episodes of the first season of the Hulu series Guidance and the following year she appeared in six fourth-season episodes of East Los High.

In 2020, Jollette portrayed Bette Whitlaw in the Netflix series Tiny Pretty Things, combining her acting and ballet expertise. That same year, she starred in the music video for the posthumously released Tom Petty song "Leave Virginia Alone", directed by Petty’s daughter Adria and Mark Seliger. In 2025 she appeared in two episodes of the third season of Dark Winds.

Jollette’s first feature film appearance was in Divergent (2014), in which she had an uncredited role. In 2017 she appeared in the children’s film F.R.E.D.I. She had another film role in 2023, in Perpetrator.

== Personal life ==
Jollette has three rescue dogs, Winnie, Cowboy and IPA, that she rescued from Costa Rica while vacationing. Winnie was featured in an article with Jollette and boyfriend Captain Barto for clothing label Free People.

== Filmography ==
=== Film ===
Year	Title	Role	Notes
2012	Sweet 16	Angelina	Short
2014	Divergent	Claire Sutton	
2014	The Idol	Audrey	Short
2015	The Onion's Clickhole: Take the Pledge	Rachael	Short
2017	F.R.E.D.I.	Natalie	
2023	Perpetrator	Aviva	

=== Television ===
Year	Title	Role	Notes
2014	Chicago P.D.	Daughter	Guest star (1 episode)
2015	Guidance	Linz	Main Cast (6 episodes)
2015	East Los High	Morgan	Guest star (6 episodes)
2016	Sleep Tight	Des	Supporting (1 episode)
2017	Dimension 404	Brie	Supporting (1 episode)
2018	Code Black	Danica Fields	Guest star (1 episode)
2019	Dirty John	Skylar	Guest star (1 episode)
2019	This Is Us	Dancer	Guest star (1 episode)
2020	Tiny Pretty Things	Bette Whitlaw	Main cast (10 episodes)
2025	Dark Winds	Suzanne	Guest star (2 episodes)
2025	Brilliant Minds	Juliette	Guest star (1 episode)

Music Videos

Year	Song	Artist
2013	"Ooh"	Steve Aoki
2017	"Waterslide"	Chon
2018	"Let it Roar"	Niki and Gabi
2020	"Leave Virginia Alone"	Tom Petty
