= The Free Fall =

- Film poster
- Directed by: Adam Stilwell
- Written by: Kent Harper
- Produced by: Sean E. DeMott; Gill Gayle; Paul Holbrook; Patrick Rizzotti
- Starring: Andrea Londo; Shawn Ashmore; Jane Badler
- Cinematography: James Kniest
- Edited by: Peter Gvozdas
- Music by: Joseph Bishara
- Production companies: Crossroad Productions; Execution Style Entertainment
- Distributed by: Gravitas Ventures
- Release dates: 7 October 2021 (Grimmfest Film Festival); 14 January 2022 (US)
- Running time: 82 minutes
- Country: United States
- Language: English

The Free Fall is a 2021 American horror drama film directed by Adam Stilwell, starring Andrea Londo, Shawn Ashmore, and Jane Badler.

== Plot ==
Recently wed Sarah witnesses her mother murder her father and attempts suicide in the bathtub of her parents home. She awakens to her husband, Nick, but she has little memory of what happened before she woke up. She remembers things but their appearances are altered, such as Nick and her clothing styles.

Sarah has several strange interactions with Rose, her and Nick's maid. Throughout the happening Nick gives her pills while working on a book. At a banquet Sarah stabs an attendee in the hand with a fork. Rose drugged her wine and Sarah eventually blacks out waking in a bathtub where Nick tends to her in a pig mask. He reveals that she actually stabbed the guest in the neck and not in his hand like she believed, and that was the final step she needed to do and he can finally take her "home". Frightened, she runs to her room to get the key she was given by the stranger who claimed to be a friend of her sister Julie. Nick confronts Sarah trying to convince her that he is only trying to help her and she needs to trust him. She escapes Nick and uses the key to open the door Rose claimed earlier leads to the third floor, and was locked for her safety, because it leads to the roof and they were afraid that she might attempt suicide again. After going through the door Sarah finds herself in a pitch black room with a bright light at the other side. Confused she begins walking towards the light, but is attacked by the people who were guests of the dinner party who are actually dead. Sarah escapes and runs to the light which brings her into the library. She finds a book named Rose, in that book it shows a picture of Eve in the Garden of Eden and the snake that offered Eve the apple. The only word that is written on every page is "apple". Sarah realizes that the book Nick's has been writing is titled Sarah and contains nothing but the word "apple" repeated hundreds of times on every page. Trying to escape she goes to the window and finds the stranger who gave her the key is in the yard and is trying to help her. Nick appears and tries to convince her that she is imagining everything, but the man throws holy water through the window and it burns Nick's face. Once Sarah sees this she jumps out of the window.

She wakes up and it is revealed the stranger is a priest who has been performing an exorcism on Sarah in her parents home and Nick is actually a demon who has been possessing her. After the priest successfully removes the demon he explains that despite the success of the exorcism Sarah is not completely safe, and she is still in danger of being possessed again so she must fill herself with light and God. When they are finally alone Julie turns to Sarah and gives her the same pills Nick was giving her, and the demon that now possesses Julie proclaims that things will be different now. The film ends zoomed on Sarah's eye.

== Cast ==
- Andrea Londo as Sarah
- Shawn Ashmore as Nick
- Jane Badler as Rose
- Michael Berry Jr. as Tom
- Elizabeth Cappuccino as Julie
- Dominic Hoffman as Dr. Sims
- Lorenzo Antonucci as Bobby
- Marc Senter as Marc
- Nathaniel Peterson as Nathaniel
- Madeleine Coghlan as Madeline
- Diane Ayala Goldner as Veiled Woman
- Jackie Dallas as Annette
- Samuel Davis as Kevin

== Release ==
The film premiered at the Grimmfest Film Festival on 7 October 2021.

== Reception ==
On the review aggregator website Rotten Tomatoes, 53% of 17 critics' reviews are positive, with an average rating of 6.4/10.

Sharai Bohannon of Dread Central rated the film 5 stars out of 5 and called it "equal parts haunting, disturbing, and beautiful." Jenn Adams of Rue Morgue called the film a "haunting and relentless journey through a beautiful nightmare". Alex Sakaliev of Film Threat gave the film a score of 5/10 and praised Kniest's "smooth, long tracking shots and exquisite framing complement the beautiful lighting and set design", as well as the performances of Londo and Ashmore. However, he criticised the "amateurish" dialogue, the "cheap shock scares" and the "over-abundance of (and reliance on) jarring flashbacks and dream sequences".
