= Knives and Skin =

2019 American psychological thriller film

- Film poster
- Directed by: Jennifer Reeder
- Written by: Jennifer Reeder
- Produced by: Brian Hieggelke; Jan Hieggelke
- Starring: Raven Whitley; Ty Olwin; Marika Engelhardt
- Cinematography: Christopher Rejano
- Edited by: Mike Olenick
- Music by: Nick Zinner
- Production company: Newcity's Chicago Film Project
- Release date: February 9, 2019 (Berlin)
- Running time: 111 minutes
- Country: United States
- Language: English

Knives and Skin is a 2019 American psychological thriller film written and directed by Jennifer Reeder. Set in an unnamed small town in the American Midwest, the film centers on the disappearance of high school student Carolyn Harper (Raven Whitley), and explores its effect on the townspeople.

The film's cast also includes Ty Olwin, Marika Engelhardt, Marilyn Dodds Frank, Tim Hopper, Audrey Francis, Grace Smith, James Vincent Meredith, Robert T. Cunningham, Kayla Carter and Kate Arrington. It premiered at the 2019 Berlin International Film Festival, and had its American premiere at the Tribeca Film Festival.

== Reception ==
Lorry Kikta of Film Threat praised the film's stylized production design and described it as "one of the more artful pastiches of high school noir", giving it a score of 10 out of 10. Andrew Parker of theGATE.ca called the film "one of the strangest, funniest, and creepiest films of the year" and wrote that its pastel and neon-heavy color palette "stuns at every turn".

On review aggregator Rotten Tomatoes, the film holds an approval rating of 69% based on 74 reviews, with an average rating of 6.3/10. Its consensus reads, "Knives and Skin's daunting ambitions occasionally elude its grasp, but this remains a powerfully written and uniquely timely coming-of-age thriller." On Metacritic, the film has a weighted average score of 58 out of 100, based on 10 critics, indicating "mixed or average" reviews.
