= Crossfire (series) =

- Genre: First-person shooter
- Developer: Smilegate
- Publisher: Smilegate
- Platforms: Microsoft Windows, Xbox One, Xbox Series X/S, iOS, Android
- First release: Crossfire; May 3, 2007
- Latest release: Crossfire: Sierra Squad; August 29, 2023
- Spin-offs: Crossfire HD, CrossfireX, Crossfire mobile, Crossfire: Sierra Squad

Crossfire is a series of video games that are mainly tactical first-person shooter games. The series was created by Smilegate and debuted on Microsoft Windows; it has expanded to other genres and platforms.

== Gameplay ==
The series is mainly known for its search-and-destroy/defuse objective-based modes. Players on one team try to plant and detonate a bomb, while the other team tries to defend the bombsites or defuse the bomb.

== Games ==
Release timeline
2007	Crossfire
2008
2009
2010
2011
2012
2013
2014
2015	Crossfire Mobile
2016
2017
2018
2019
2020	Crossfire Zero; Crossfire: Warzone
2021	Crossfire HD
2022	CrossfireX; Crossfire: Legion
2023	Crossfire: Sierra Squad
2024
2025
TBA	Codename: Crossfire 0 Crossfire: Rainbow; Crossfire 2 Crossfire

=== Main series ===
==== Crossfire ====
Crossfire, the first game in the series, was released for Microsoft Windows on May 3, 2007. The game was multiplayer focused with no single-player campaign. The game is one of the most played first person shooters in the world.

==== Crossfire HD ====
Crossfire HD is a free spin-off first-person shooter PC game set to be released exclusively for China. This game has been described as a remastered version of the original Crossfire using Unreal Engine 3. Crossfire HD went into a fourth closed beta in China in August 2020. Crossfire HD has officially been released to the public on the 10th June 2021 in China.

==== Crossfire Zero ====
Crossfire Zero (or CrossFire Web in China) was a free spin-off first-person shooter PC game for China in 2017 and the Southeast Asian market released in January 2020. This game featured two game modes, one which offered classic modes such as S&D and Team Deathmatch and the other offering a Battle Royale style mode. The game ran on Unity and has been closed on an unknown date in China and 28th October 2020 for Southeast Asian market.

==== CrossfireX ====
CrossfireX was a first-person shooter released exclusively for Xbox One and Xbox Series X/S. Smilegate Entertainment wanted to expand the narrative of the franchise and introduce it to a broader audience. Therefore, the team partnered with Xbox Game Studios to create a console version and entrusted Remedy Entertainment, a Finnish video game developer, to create a single-player campaign for the game. As Remedy at that time was exploring the idea of working on a first-person shooter, and planned on developing multiple projects at once, the team agreed to help Smilegate. Remedy had been working on the single-player portion since 2016. The single-player portion will be powered by Remedy's own Northlight engine, which was used previously in Quantum Break and Control. Remedy was chosen due to the team's expertise in creating memorable fictional worlds and characters. Inspired by Metal Gear Solid and Resident Evil, the team hoped to create characters that are "larger-than-life".

On February 3, 2023, Smilegate announced that the game would shut down on May 18, 2023.

==== Crossfire: Sierra Squad ====
Crossfire: Sierra Squad is a first-person shooter developed and published by Smilegate for Microsoft Windows and PlayStation 5's virtual reality headset PlayStation VR2. The game was released on August 29, 2023.

==== Crossfire 2 ====
Crossfire 2 is a first-person shooter currently in development by Smilegate. Not officially announced, game is listed on Smilegate's official website careers page. Game is to use Unreal Engine 5.

=== Spin-off games ===
==== Crossfire Mobile ====
Crossfire Mobile (also known as Crossfire: Legends) is a free application for mobile users to play a separate Crossfire experience on the go; while maintaining the overall aesthetic of the original game. The application is developed by Smilegate and Tencent. The game is running on Unity and was released on December 3 (2015) for iOS and Android devices to all markets. The game is now only operating in China as other markets have been closed.

==== Crossfire: Warzone ====
Crossfire: Warzone is a spin-off real-time strategy mobile game, for iOS and Android mobile devices. It was developed by Joycity, and released on July 28, 2020.

==== Crossfire: Legion ====
Crossfire: Legion is a real-time strategy video game developed by Blackbird Interactive and published by Prime Matter and Smilegate for Windows PC. The game was released through early access on May 24, 2022, and fully on September 8, 2022.

The developer announced in an official Steam post in July 2025 that the game would sadly be delisted from the Steam store on August 18, 2025.

==== Crossfire (TBA) ====
Crossfire is an upcoming tactical shooter developed by That's No Moon and published by Smilegate on consoles and Team K1 on PC. It is a single-player-only video game and is set to be released for Windows, PlayStation 5 and Xbox Series X and Series S.

== Other media ==
=== Film adaptation ===
In October 2015, it was announced that Neal Moritz would be producing a film version of Crossfire, after spending a year weighing up proposals from Hollywood producers and studios. A year later, Chuck Hogan was announced to be in charge of writing the script.

In February 2020, it was announced that Sony Pictures will be developing the film adaptation, Tencent Pictures will co-produce and co-finance and Moritz will produce through his Original Film banner.

=== Television drama ===
Crossfire, a Chinese television drama series produced by Youhug Media and Tencent Holdings, premiered on July 20, 2020. The plot is a coming-of-age story about two young Crossfire gamers, played by Chinese movie stars Lu Han and Leo Wu, attempting to compete in Crossfire e-sports competitions. The show became a commercial success, receiving more than 980 million views on online streaming platforms within four weeks of release. As of October 2020, the show has received more than 1.7 billion views in China.

=== Animation ===
Season 1 of the animated anthology series, Secret Level, released December 2024, included an episode titled "Crossfire: Good Conflict", which was inspired by this franchise.
