= CrossfireX =

2022 video game

- Developer: Smilegate Entertainment (Note: Operation Catalyst and Operation Spectre single-player campaigns were developed by Remedy Entertainment.)
- Publisher: Smilegate Entertainment
- Directors: Zoltan Fejes; Anton Nikolaienko; Mikko Kinnunen
- Producer: Tuukka Taipalvesi
- Designers: Thomas Hudson; Juan Gracia; Anssi Hyytiäinen; Mircea Purdea; Joshua Stubbs
- Programmer: Timo Sihvo
- Artists: Tero Tolsa; Sampo Rask; Antti Herva
- Writers: Doug Van Horne; Ashley Smith
- Composer: Petri Alanko
- Series: Crossfire
- Engine: Unreal Engine 4 Northlight Engine (single-player)
- Platforms: Xbox One; Xbox Series X/S
- Release: February 10, 2022
- Genre: First-person shooter
- Modes: Single-player, multiplayer

CrossfireX was a first-person shooter game developed and published by Smilegate Entertainment and released for Xbox One and Xbox Series X/S on February 10, 2022. The game was the third installment in the Crossfire series. Remedy Entertainment worked on the game's two single-player campaigns, which are also available on Crossfire HD. It received generally negative reviews from critics. CrossfireX was shut down on May 18, 2023.

== Gameplay ==
CrossfireX was a first-person shooter and the console version of Crossfire (2007). The free-to-play multiplayer component is similar to Counter-Strike: Global Offensive, which sees two opposing teams, representing two hostile private military factions, compete in game modes to complete objectives. Classic mode sees the attacking team attempting to plant a bomb while the defending team has to stop them. All players are equipped with standard weapons. The Spectre mode is a variation of the classic mode, though the attacking players are spectres, who are only equipped with knives but they can stay invisible when they are not moving. There is also a Modern mode, in which the two teams need to fight for maintaining control over two objective points in a map.

The single-player portion, which is also found on Crossfire HD on PC in China, which would not be free-to-play, consists of several operations. Each operation includes several episodes. At launch, there would be two operations available. The story explores a global conflict between Black List and Global Risk, two private military factions.

== Plot ==
=== Operation Catalyst ===
The first campaign follows a team of Global Risk Soldiers in the country of Azkharzia who are sent in to find and kill Black List officer Alexander Steiner. The Global Risk team is led by Major Cavanaugh and consists of Captain Hall, Specialist Randall, and Private First Class Moralez. The team assault an abandoned hotel where Steiner is supposedly staying but soon find out they've instead killed Steiner's body double. Although the team manage to fight their way out of the hotel, Cavanaugh and Hall deduce that they were set up as Black List was well prepared for their arrival. Cavanaugh is shot shortly afterwards and Hall is knocked unconscious by an unseen assailant. While unconscious, Hall has an unsettling vision of being in his own house through the eyes of someone else. Hall is soon reawakened by Moralez and takes command of the team.

With their extraction aircraft shot down and Cavanaugh's long range radio missing, Hall plans to use a nearby communications tower to call for extraction despite Moralez's insistence on heading towards the rally point instead. While making his way up the tower, Hall is captured and interrogated by Steiner who reveals that Cavanaugh is alive and demands his location. After breaking free with the help of his team, Hall plans to head towards mines where Cavanaugh is supposedly being held and manages to capture Steiner along the way. However the team is soon ambushed by Black List soldiers led by the ambitious Commander Fontaine and soon Moralez who has secretly been contracted by Fontaine to sell out the team. Moralez soon kills Steiner under Fontaine's orders but refuses to kill Hall and Randall as it wasn't part of their deal, leading Fontaine to kill Moralez instead while Hall and Randall manage to escape.

Despite being outnumbered, the survivors continue deeper into the mines, where they discover a facility housing a supercomputer known as Catalyst, which is capable of predicting the future through human memories. It is soon revealed that Fontaine plans to use Cavanaugh's future memories to wipe out Global Risk. However, Hall manages to shoot her before the machine kills him, and the team escapes by helicopter.

=== Operation Spectre ===
In the year 2022, Black List contractor Lieutenant Logan Brewer (played by Anderson Davis) raids a Global Risk train heading for its headquarters in an attempt to assassinate Cavanaugh before Global Risk could test their re-engineered Catalyst technologies. The mission is a failure, partly thanks to the intervention by the highly skilled and aggressive Global Risk General Maddox, but Logan successfully extracts some intel and passes it along to Cora Windsor, his teammate and technology expert. Based on that intel, Logan, Cora, and Specialist Nicholas Kamara (played by Jamel King) rescue Luis Torres (played by Louis Boyer), an orphan teenage petty thief, from Global Risk soldiers led by Maddox who has placed a kill on sight order on Torres's head. Torres is mortally injured during the ensuing chase but saved by a now crippled Fontaine, who injects an experimental technology called Nanodyne into him. Fontaine states that Nanodyne will turn him into a Ghost, a "weapon" with enhanced physical capabilities that is a future threat to the Global Risk and the reason why the PMC seeks to pre-emptively eliminate him, but will kill him if not stabilized by a device called EOE within the next few weeks. Torres is thus forced to work for Black List in order to gain a venue to such a device.

Later on the Black List team raids a Global Risk facility in the Global Risk Dam (based on the Hoover Dam) for its cache of EOEs, but the first EOE they encounter is remotely overloaded, alerting the Global Risk troops and leading to the team getting captured. Torres manages to free himself and proceeds to rescue his teammates, but Cora betrays and shoots Torres, revealing that she has been secretly sabotaging the mission and reveals that the future she actually saw. Cora explains that Fontaine has withheld the knowledge that Nanodyne will eventually reduce Ghosts to mindless killing machines, resulting in Ghosts turning against Black List as well as Humanity as a whole in the future.

Torres nonetheless survives, steals a prototype cloaking battle suit, and returns to Black List headquarters with his team (minus Cora, who deserts the team after shooting Torres), only to find the headquarters on the verge of being overrun by Global Risk forces. Nicholas seemingly dies when the tiltrotor used by the team is shot down, and Logan is killed soon afterwards by mortar fires. Enraged by the loss of his recently bonded friends, Torres decides to embrace his new identity as a Ghost and fully activates his nanotech augmentations. Declaring his loyalty to be with Black List rather than Fontaine herself, Torres later finds Nicholas to still be alive and, at his behest, reaches the abandoned base control center to reactivate automated defense guns. He succeeds, resulting in much of Global Risk's air support being neutralized before a siege mecha piloted by Maddox directly bombards the control center, disabling the defenses once again. Torres proceeds to sneak up on the mecha and breaches its cockpit, forcing Maddox to fight him hand-to-hand. Torres ends up besting and killing Maddox, throwing Global Risk forces into disarray and allowing Black List survivors to stand their ground. In the epilogue narration, Cora laments that Ghosts have become a reality as foretold and will in time become a threat to the whole world, rendering the feud between Black List and Global Risk irrelevant. Six months later, Torres is seen raiding a Global Risk facility, joined by more people implied to be Ghosts like him.

== Development ==
The original Crossfire, developed by Smilegate Entertainment, is an extremely popular free-to-play multiplayer game for personal computers in the East. The team wanted to expand the narrative of the franchise and introduce it to a broader audience. Therefore, the team partnered with Microsoft to create a console version and entrusted Remedy Entertainment, a Finnish video game developer, to create a single-player campaign for the game, alongside a PC version of the campaign for Crossfire HD in China. As Remedy at that time was exploring the idea of working on a first-person shooter, and planned on developing multiple projects at once, the team agreed to help Smilegate. Remedy had been working on the single-player portion since 2016. The single-player portion was powered by Remedy's own Northlight engine, which was used previously in Quantum Break and Control. Remedy was chosen due to the team's expertise in creating memorable fictional worlds and characters. Inspired by Metal Gear Solid and Resident Evil, the team hoped to create characters that are "larger-than-life".

An open beta was available for Xbox Insiders from June 25 to June 28, 2020. In November 2020, Smilegate Entertainment announced that the game would be delayed to 2021. The game was eventually released on February 10, 2022, for Xbox One and Xbox Series X/S consoles.

CrossfireX was shut down on May 18, 2023.

== Reception ==
Reception

Aggregate score
Aggregator	Score
Metacritic	XSXS: 38/100

Review scores
Publication	Score
IGN	Single-player: 3/10; Multiplayer: 2/10
NME	2/5
Windows Central	2/5

CrossfireX received "generally unfavorable" reviews from critics, according to review aggregator website Metacritic. Metacritic listed CrossfireX as the second-worst game of 2022.

IGN criticized the storytelling, calling the characters bland while describing the multiplayer as having "atrocious gunplay and controls". Polygon criticized the pacing of the game.
