= Crossfire: Legion =

- Developer: Blackbird Interactive
- Publishers: Prime Matter; Smilegate
- Designer: Maurice Grela
- Series: Crossfire
- Engine: Unity
- Platform: Microsoft Windows
- Release: December 8, 2022
- Genre: Real-time strategy
- Modes: Single-player, multiplayer

Crossfire: Legion is a real-time strategy video game developed by Blackbird Interactive and published by Prime Matter and Smilegate for Windows via early access on May 24, 2022 and in full on December 8, 2022. The game is a strategic take on the Crossfire first-person shooter series. In Crossfire: Legion, players take control over three different factions fighting each other in the near future. Each faction has unique commanders, infantry units, vehicles and airborne units; all of them are upgradeable and can use special abilities.

== Gameplay ==
The real-time battles are fought on multiplayer maps, in cooperative scenarios and in a single-player campaign. Three factions gain fuel and materials by sending mechanized workers into prebuilt nodes and facilities. Both resources are needed to produce new units, construct buildings and finance upgrades. The three factions use different strategies regarding their unit types and tactics. Global Risk is a counter-terrorist organization established by world governments. It focusses on long range units like the “Phalanx” tank and rocket troopers. “Global Risk” attacks mostly from the distance. Black List is a break-away group of former Global Risk members who use guerilla tactics like ambushes with fast, light units like the “Cheetah” buggy and “Falcon” helicopter. New Horizon focusses on heavy units like the bipedal “Titan” mech which are expensive, powerful and well armored. The faction’s Commander “Angel” supports her troops by deploying energy fields to strengthen its armor or to damage hostile units.

In addition to the single-player campaign, the game features several competitive multiplayer modes. In "Versus", up to six players or AI bots in two teams compete in the versus mode. The goal is to destroy all hostile core bases. In the mode "Payload", players must escort three payloads to their opponents’ bases or to destroy their core base. An online cooperative multiplayer named "Operation Thunderstrike" is also available. In this mode, up to three players build a base and defend it against computer-controlled enemy waves, while they escort or protect a specific target. Side missions help to fulfill the goals.

== Development ==
Crossfire: Legion is developed by the Canadian game development studio Blackbird Interactive. It was announced by publisher Prime Matter, a Koch Media premium label, in June 2021. In January 2022 the game was revealed to the public. In February 2022 a multiplayer demo was published on Steam and in December 8, 2022 full game is released.

The developer announced in an official Steam post in July 2025 that the game would sadly be delisted from the Steam store on August 18, 2025.
