= FBC: Firebreak =

2025 video game

- Developer: Remedy Entertainment
- Publisher: Remedy Entertainment
- Director: Mike Kayatta
- Designer: Anssi Hyytiäinen
- Artist: James Tottman
- Writer: Mike Kayatta
- Composer: Petri Alanko
- Series: Control
- Engine: Northlight
- Platforms: PlayStation 5; Windows; Xbox Series X/S
- Release: 17 June 2025
- Genre: First-person shooter
- Mode: Multiplayer

FBC: Firebreak is a 2025 first-person shooter video game developed and published by Remedy Entertainment. Set six years after the events of Control, it follows a special unit of soldiers named Firebreak.

FBC: Firebreak was released for PlayStation 5, Windows and Xbox Series X/S on 17 June 2025. The game received mixed reviews from critics and failed to meet the sales expectations of Remedy.

On 18 March 2026, the final major update for FBC: Firebreak, titled "Open House", was released. Remedy announced the cessation of new content development to refocus on narrative-driven titles like Control Resonant, while promising to maintain relay servers for the foreseeable future.

== Gameplay ==
FBC: Firebreak is a team-based player versus environment first-person shooter, in which a group of three players - taking on the role of the Federal Bureau of Control's "Firebreak" containment teams - must venture into the Oldest House to eliminate various human enemies controlled by the extradimensional Hiss. The game is set after the events of Control.

Players utilize "Crisis Kits", which include customizable loadouts of specialized firearms, grenades, and "Paranatural Augments"—bizarre items that grant unique abilities similar to Objects of Power. The game features a wave-based survival mode called "Endless Shift", which takes place in shifting arenas inspired by locations from the original Control. Following the "Open House" update, a "Friend's Pass" system was implemented, allowing owners of the full game to invite players who do not own it to join their cooperative sessions for free.

== Development and release ==
The project was announced in June 2021 under the codename of "Condor" in a press release by Remedy Entertainment. It was intended to be co-published and developed by 505 Games, the publisher on the first Control game. In February 2024, Remedy Entertainment announced it had bought the rights to the Control franchise, including the publishing rights for the game, from 505 Games for €17 million. In April 2024, it was confirmed by Remedy that the initial budget for the game was stated to be €25 million. It was also confirmed to be pay-to-play, as opposed to many other multiplayer games.

Throughout late 2025 and early 2026, Remedy attempted to reinvigorate the player base with two major patches: the "Rogue Protocol" update in January 2026, which overhauled mission scaling, and the "Open House" update in March 2026. The latter coincided with a permanent price reduction to $19.99 for the base game. During this period, former EA executive Jean-Charles Gaudechon was appointed as the new CEO of Remedy, succeeding interim CEO Markus Mäki in March 2026.

== Reception ==
Reception

Aggregate scores
Aggregator	Score
Metacritic	(PC) 64/100 (PS5) 65/100 (XSXS) 66/100
OpenCritic	24% recommend

Review scores
Publication	Score
Destructoid	7.5/10
Digital Trends	2.5/5
Eurogamer	3/5
GameSpot	8/10
GamesRadar+	2/5
IGN	6/10
PC Gamer (US)	60/100
Push Square	6/10
Shacknews	8/10
TechRadar	1.5/5

FBC: Firebreak received "mixed or average" reviews from critics, according to review aggregator website Metacritic. OpenCritic determined that 24% of critics recommended the game.

=== Sales ===
FBC: Firebreak attracted more than 1 million players by 26 June 2025. Despite high initial engagement via Xbox Game Pass, the title suffered from rapid player attrition.

In February 2026, Remedy reported a €14.9 million non-cash write-down for the fiscal year 2025, directly attributed to the game's poor commercial performance. The company issued a profit warning, noting that while the game "succeeded technically," consumer sales were significantly lower than anticipated, particularly on Steam.
