= Focus on You =

2019 video game

- Developer: Smilegate Entertainment
- Publisher: Smilegate Entertainment
- Director: Won-seok Choi
- Producer: Won-seok Choi
- Platforms: PlayStation 4, Windows
- Release: AS: July 5, 2019; NA: July 15, 2019
- Genre: Adventure
- Mode: Single-player

Focus on You, stylized FOCUS on YOU, is a 2019 adventure dating sim video game produced by Smilegate Entertainment for PlayStation 4 and Windows. It was released on July 5, 2019.

== Synopsis ==
Focus on You is a virtual reality game in which player, a high school student that likes photography, goes on a date with a female character called Han Yua at virtual places. The player is able to capture photos taken together with Han Yua in order to make a photo album and create "memories".

== Development and release ==
According to the developer, over 100 hours of motion capture were used to develop the character animations and make her as realistic as possible. The tentative name for the character was Song Ah-yeon with a given age of sixteen years. The actress who played the character is herself named Han Yua and was signed by the K-pop label YG Entertainment in 2022. It was directed by Kim Yongha.

Focus on You was announced during the 2018 Tokyo Game Show. It was first released on July 5, 2019, and requires a PlayStation VR, Oculus Rift or HTC Vive virtual reality headset.

Smilegate has released numerous DLC with additional content. The first of these was the Studio DLC, followed by the 100th Day DLC in 2020 which included new outfits and hairstyles.

== Reception ==
Matt S. of Digitally Downloaded scored the game 4.5 out of 5, writing that "it is beautifully produced and performed", but that "it's not exactly a deep and meaningful experience". Smilegate received the "Next-generation Game Award" for Focus on You at the 2019 Korea Game Awards.
