= John Kaefer =

American composer

- Born: October 1, 1976 (age 49)
- Genres: Film scores, concert music, multimedia
- Occupation: Composer
- Years active: 2006-present
- Website: https://www.johnkaefer.com

John Kaefer (born October 1, 1976) is a composer for film, television, and the concert stage.

== Education ==
Kaefer is a doctoral graduate of The Juilliard School and also earned degrees in composition from Yale University (MM) and the Eastman School of Music (BM).

== Career ==
Kaefer began his professional television music career during his time at The Juilliard School, where he composed the music for the TV mini-series Dance School: Juilliard. He then went on to compose the scores for several short films, including To Kill A Bore (2006) and They Say It's Wonderful (2006), and In Pursuit of Woody Allen (2007). In 2007, he provided additional music for another short, Room Service, as well as for his first feature film, Mama's Boy. He also began working on ABC's Good Morning America, co-composing the theme music and the rest of the score until 2012. Kaefer also co-composed the music for Good Morning America Weekend Edition.

In 2009, Kaefer composed for another short film, Forget Me Not, and contributed the theme music for Focus Earth with Bob Woodruff. That year, he also composed the thematic music package for ABC's hour-long news magazine, 20/20.

In 2010, Kaefer composed his second full-length film score for the crime-drama The Rise and Fall of Their American Dream and for another short, Lily of the Feast. He was credited as music programmer and orchestrator for the film One Fall in 2011. In 2012, Kaefer composed for another short, Pandora's Box, and ended his time with Good Morning America and Good Morning America Weekend Edition.

In 2013, Kaefer provided the theme music for Primetime: Would You Fall for That?. He also scored his first documentary, A Polite Bribe. In 2014, Kaefer worked on the series, Sequestered, the first season of which aired on the Crackle network. He composed the music for his second documentary by Robert Orlando, Silence Patton, the following year in 2015.

Kaefer worked on the score for the live-action sequences of Quantum Break, a third-person shooter action game released for the Xbox One on April 5, 2016. He composed the music for the Fullscreen series, Making Moves, which will be released on April 26, 2016, and he also composed the theme music for The Kidnapping of a Fish, a short set to release later in 2016.

== Concert Music ==
As a composer for the concert stage, Kaefer's music has been programmed by The Pacific Symphony, Eighth Blackbird, the Aspen Music Festival Contemporary Ensemble, The Juilliard Orchestra, Symphony In C (Haddonfield Symphony), The New York Youth Symphony, the Chamber Symphony of New Jersey and The Yale Philharmonia.

Kaefer has led performances at venues including Carnegie Hall and Lincoln Center in New York, Wigmore Hall in London, and La Schola Cantorum in Paris.

== Awards ==
In 2000, Kaefer was recipient of the American Academy of Arts and Letters' Charles Ives Scholarship. The following year, he received the Morton Gould Composer Award from the ASCAP Foundation.

Kaefer received the BMI foundation's Student Composer Award in 2002 and the Pete Carpenter Fellowship in 2006. He was also a panelist/advisor to Mike Post for the Pete Carpenter Fellowship from 2007 to 2010.

Kaefer has been a guest composer and instructor in the American Composers Orchestra, Film Music Factory Program and is a member and mentor for the Society of Composers and Lyricists (SCL).

== Filmography ==
=== Film ===
Year	Title	Director(s)	Studio(s)	Notes
2006	To Kill a Bore (short)	Sunah Kim Schultz	Wandering Scholar Productions	Composer
2006	They Say It's Wonderful (short)	Mitchell Kase		Composer
2007	In Pursuit of Woody Allen (short)	Richard Portnow	Charles River Films Stoic Films	Composer
2007	Room Service (short)	Kevin Castro	Emmett/Furla/Oasis Films Valhalla Motion Pictures	Composer
2007	Mama's Boy	Tim Hamilton	Warner Bros. Carr-Santelli	Additional Music
2009	Forget Me Not (short)	Federico Castelluccio	YMC Films	Composer
2010	The Rise and Fall of Their American Dream	Nash Bhatt	Nash Productions	Composer
2010	Lily of the Feast (short)	Federico Castelluccio		Composer
2011	One Fall	Marcus Dean Fuller	Compass Entertainment	Music Programmer, Orchestrator
2012	Pandora's Box (short)	Thomas G. Waites	Back Pocket Productions TRM Productions	Composer
2013	A Polite Bribe	Robert Orlando	Nexus Media	Composer
2015	Silence Patton	Robert Orlando	The Nexus Project	Composer
2016	The Kidnapping of a Fish (in post-production)	Philip A. Ramos	Team Biscuit Films That Storm Films	Theme music

=== Television ===
Year	Title	Director(s)	Notes
2006	Dance School: Juilliard (TV Mini-series)	Carlos Chaco Elyse Sara	n/a
2009	Focus Earth with Bob Woodruff		Composer (theme music)
2007-2012	Good Morning America	Various	Co-composer
2008-2012	Good Morning America Weekend Edition	Various	Co-composer
2013	Primetime: Would You Fall For That?		Composer (theme music) - Episodes #1.1, "Celebrity" and "Reservation"
2009-2014	20/20	Various	Co-composer - 135 episodes
2014	Sequestered	Kevin Tancharoen Shawn Ku	Composer - 12 episodes
2016	Making Moves		Composer

=== Video game ===
Year	Title	Director(s)	Notes
2016	Quantum Break	Ben Ketai	Live action show - 4 episodes
