= Crossfire (upcoming video game) =

- Developer: That's No Moon
- Publishers: Smilegate (consoles); Team K1 (PC)
- Directors: Taylor Kurosaki; Jacob Minkoff
- Engine: Unreal Engine 5
- Platforms: PlayStation 5; Windows; Xbox Series X/S
- Genre: Tactical shooter
- Mode: Single-player

Crossfire is an upcoming third-person shooter developed by That's No Moon and published by Smilegate. As a single-player-only video game set in the Crossfire universe, it is set to be released for PlayStation 5, Windows, and Xbox Series X/S.

== Gameplay ==
Crossfire is a tactical shooter video game played from a third-person perspective. The story follows two opposing mercenaries Layla Qassem (Claudia Doumit) and Delroy Cross (Ricky Whittle), who must reluctantly work together to fight against a lethal threat. Layla serves as the playable protagonist, though Delroy can distract enemies, draw fire away, and assist in killing opponents. Players have access to various weapons and advanced gadgets such as an invisibility cloak. However, the player character's health will deplete quickly if they are attacked, and they must rely on stealth tactics to succeed. The game features an adaptive cover system, allowing the player character to change their positioning and naturally adjust to and hide behind environmental objects of varying heights.

== Development ==
Crossfire is currently being developed by That's No Moon, a studio based in Los Angeles and founded in July 2021 by former Infinity Ward and Naughty Dog employees. The two game directors, Taylor Kurosaki and Jacob Minkoff, were known for serving as the creative leads of the campaign of Call of Duty: Modern Warfare (2019). Korean publisher Smilegate invested $100 million into the studio to expand its reach in the Western Hemisphere. Smilegate wanted a game with universal appeal and did not mandate a connection to the Crossfire series. However, after studying its narrative and lore, That's No Moon decided to base the game on the franchise anyway, feeling the title fit with the story they wanted to tell. Unlike other games in the series, Crossfire is a single-player-only game, with no live service element attached. Crossfire was developed with a team of about 230 people.

The goal for the studio was to serve as a bridge between military simulation games and accessible action games. The Adaptive Cover was created to simplify complex gameplay mechanics like stance management, and allow the team to create levels with a more believable design. This system was made possible by Unreal Engine 5's Nanite and Lumen technologies. Minkoff described Crossfire as a "stealth forward" game, in which players must learn to read the environment and navigate it strategically to succeed. While Delroy serves as a prominent character, Layla is the primary player character, as the team wanted players to stay invested in her emotional journey throughout the campaign.

Crossfire is a narrative-driven game. Unlike other Crossfire games, which are played from a first-person perspective, the game adopts a third-person camera system to better tell its story. Kurosaki added that the team was inspired by war movies such as Dunkirk and All Quiet on the Western Front, which "use the pressure of war to reveal a character’s true nature". Describing these movies as prestige pictures, the team aimed to create a prestige, tentpole military-themed game, a proposition considered a rarity in the industry. Kurosaki compared the dynamics between the lead characters to those from Planes, Trains, and Automobiles, Midnight Run or The Odd Couple. The two characters must learn to put aside their differences to overcome an otherwise insurmountable threat. The team also believed that the game's similarities to military simulation games, known for their hard difficulty, would cause players to become more invested in its story and maintain its tension. Both Claudia Doumit and Ricky Whittle reprised their roles as Layla Qassem and Delroy Cross, following their appearances in an episode of the animated anthology series Secret Level.

Crossfire was revealed in June 2026 at the Summer Game Fest, and is set to be released for PlayStation 5, Windows, and Xbox Series X/S. Smilegate will publish the console versions while Team K1, a Tencent subsidiary, will publish the Windows version.
