= Kwon Hyuk-bin =

South Korean billionaire (born 1974)

- Born: 1974 (age 51–52)
- Other name: HyukBin Kwon or Kwon Hyuk-bin
- Education: Sogang University (BEng.)
- Occupations: Businessman, investor, philanthropist
- Title: Founder and Chief Visionary Officer of Smilegate

Kwon Hyuk-bin (Korean: 권혁빈; born 1974) is a South Korean businessman, investor, and philanthropist. He is a billionaire who founded South Korea's third-largest gaming company Smilegate, in 2002. Smilegate is the maker of popular games such as Crossfire, Lost Ark, and others. Crossfire is the most popular first-person shooter game in history.

He is among the richest people in South Korea. In April 2025, Forbes estimated his net wealth at US$2.55 billion and ranked him 13th richest in the country.

== Education and career ==
Kwon holds an electrical engineering degree from Sogang University. After a failed education startup, 4Csof, Kwon turned down a software engineering position at Samsung to pursue his goal of developing video games. He partnered with Tencent to break into the Chinese high-technology market.

== Philanthropy ==
Kwon operates three foundations: Hope Studio, a social contribution foundation; Orange Planet Entrepreneurship Foundation, which supports young entrepreneurs; and Future Lab, which contributes to expanding creative education environments for children and youth. He has donated over $5 million to building schools in Vietnam and China. He has also contributed over $2 million to his alma mater at Sogang University.
