= Smilegate =

South Korean video game company

Smilegate Group 스마일게이트

- Industry: Video games
- Founded: June 2002 in Seoul, South Korea
- Founder: Kwon Hyuk-Bin
- Headquarters: Pangyo, Seongnam, South Korea
- Products: Crossfire; Lost Ark; Epic Seven; LORDNINE; Chaos Zero Nightmare
- Revenue: 1.577 trillion KRW (2022)
- Operating income: 643 billion KRW (2022)
- Net income: 63.3 billion KRW (2022)
- Owner: Kwon Hyuk-Bin (100%)
- Number of employees: ~3,300 (2023)
- Parent: Smilegate Holdings
- Subsidiaries: Smilegate Entertainment; Smilegate RPG; Smilegate Megaport; Smilegate Stove; Smilegate West; SmilegateRealies; Smilegate AI; Smilegate Investment; Smilegate Asset Management; Orange Planet; Smilegate Foundation; Super Creative
- Website: www.smilegate.com/en

Smilegate (Korean: 스마일게이트) is a South Korean video game company. It is headquartered in Pangyo, Seongnam, South Korea. It develops, publishes, and services online games on mobile and PC platforms. Established in South Korea in 2002, it is the creator of Crossfire, an FPS game with over six million concurrent players across the globe. Smilegate is a corporate group owned by Smilegate Holdings.

As of 2022, it was the third largest game company in South Korea, according to The Korea Economic Daily.

== History ==
Smilegate's yearly revenue in 2021 was 1.43 trillion KRW ($1.08 billion) with 593 billion won operating profit. It was estimated to be worth $7.55 billion in 2022. In 2018 it had about 2,200 employees. Smilegate subsidiary Stove, which operates a store platform of the same name that digitally distributes video games, is dedicated to indie game developers.

=== Crossfire ===
Crossfire is an FPS that has reached more than 8 million concurrent users around the world. Crossfire is being serviced in 80 countries worldwide including China, Brazil, Vietnam, Northern America, and Europe.

Every year, Smilegate organizes an international Crossfire tournament with a prize pool of approximately 1 billion KRW titled CFS (CrossFire Stars). CFS has the largest scale among all tournaments held by video game companies in South Korea.

Smilegate made a tremendous amount of revenue from Crossfire ever since its release. With the success of Crossfire, Smilegate was nominated as one of <THE TOP 30 DEVELOPERS> by Game Developer.

According to a list made in 2014 by SuperData Research, Crossfire made the most revenue among all F2P games worldwide.

Crossfire was the world’s most played game until League of Legends took the first place in 2017.

=== Lost Ark ===
Lost Ark is a PC MMORPG developed by Smilegate RPG. Lost Ark was first released in South Korea in 2018 costing approximately 100 million KRW during the 7 years of development. It became increasingly popular in 2021 and became one of the top trending games in South Korea.

In February 2022, the game was launched in Northern America and Europe via Steam. Lost Ark reached more than 1.32 million concurrent users on Steam, becoming the most played game on the platform. The record of 1.32 million concurrent users is the second place in the entire history of Steam, the first place being 3.25 million concurrent users of PUBG: Battlegrounds. Considering that Lost Ark was only released in North America and Europe, some argue that Lost Ark was more impactful than PUBG: Battlegrounds, which was released in China as well.

=== Epic Seven ===
Epic Seven is a mobile turn-based RPG game developed by subsidiary Super Creative and released on November 8, 2018. It became Smilegate's first successful title in the West, with the United States at one point accounting more than half of its revenue. In June 2023, it released in China through Chinese publisher Zlong Games. By August 2023 it had reached $650 million in global sales. Epic Seven utilizes an in-house game engine designed to support older devices and improve loading times.

In October of 2026, it was announced that Epic Seven will be getting a PC port via Steam. It will launch on October 29.

=== LORDNINE ===
LORDNINE is a mobile MMORPG developed by NX3GAMES and published by Smilegate Megaport. It was released in July 2024. The game experienced emergency maintenance and client instability issues during its initial launch period. Within a week of release, it reached No.1 in revenue on both Google Play and the Apple App Store.

== Games ==
These are the games developed or published by Smilegate. Publisher and release dates are for South Korea unless otherwise noted.

Year	Game	Developer(s)	Publisher(s)	Platform	Ref.
2005	TalesRunner	Rhaon Entertainment	Smilegate Megaport	Microsoft Windows	
2007	Crossfire	Smilegate	Smilegate; Tencent (China), Lytogame (Indonesia), Smilegate West (NA, BR), Smilegate Megaport (Philippines)	Microsoft Windows	
2010	ProBaseball Manager Online	Sega	Smilegate Megaport	Mobile	
2011	Freestyle2: Street Basketball	JoyCity	JoyCity (US), Smilegate Megaport (South Korea)	Microsoft Windows	
2012	MVP baseball online		Smilegate	Microsoft Windows	
2013	Devil Maker: Tokyo	Ncrew Entertainment	Smilegate Megaport	Mobile	
2013	Eastern Blade		Smilegate Megaport		
2014	Qurare: Magic Library	Palmple, iO Studio	Smilegate Megaport	Mobile, PlayStation 4 (2016)	
2015	Dragon Fate	Lion Games Studios	Smilegate	Mobile	
2015	Bunnypang	Smilegate	Smilegate Megaport	Mobile	
2015	AZERA	Timber Games	Smilegate	Microsoft Windows	
2015	Crossfire: Mobile	Smilegate Entertainment	Smilegate	Mobile	
2017	SoulWorker	Lion Games Studios	Smilegate	Microsoft Windows	
2017	Super Tank Rumble	Lumidia Games	Smilegate	Mobile	
2017	TAHN	Tencent Games	Smilegate	Mobile	
2017	ChaosMasters	Neoact	Smilegate	Mobile	
2017	WarReign	Red Sahara Studio	Smilegate	Mobile	
2018	Arcane Straight	Gameplete	Smilegate Megaport	Mobile	
2018	Lost Ark	Smilegate RPG, Tripod Studio	Smilegate RPG	Microsoft Windows	
2018	Epic Seven	Super Creative	Smilegate	Microsoft Windows, Mobile	
2019	ROGAN: The Thief in the Castle	Smilegate	Smilegate	Microsoft Windows	
2019	Focus on You	Smilegate	Smilegate	Microsoft Windows, PlayStation 4	
2019	Final Assault	Phaser Lock Interactive	Smilegate	Microsoft Windows, PlayStation 4	
2020	Crossfire: Zero	Smilegate	Smilegate	Microsoft Windows	
2020	Crossfire: Warzone	JoyCity	Smilegate	Mobile	
2021	Crossfire HD	Smilegate	Tencent (China)	Microsoft Windows	
2022	CrossfireX	Smilegate, Remedy Entertainment	Smilegate	Xbox One, Xbox Series X/S	
2022	Crossfire: Legion	Blackbird Interactive	Prime Matter	Microsoft Windows	
2023	OUTERPLANE	VA Games	Smilegate Megaport	Mobile	
2023	Crossfire: Sierra Squad	Smilegate	Smilegate	Microsoft Windows, PlayStation 5 (PlayStation VR2)	
2024	Lordnine	NX3GAMES	Smilegate Megaport	Mobile	
2025	Chaos Zero Nightmare	Super Creative	Smilegate	Microsoft Windows, Mobile	
2026	MIRESI: Invisible Future	Control9	Smilegate	Mobile	
TBA	SkySaga: Infinite Isles	Radiant Worlds	Smilegate	Microsoft Windows	
TBA	Crossfire 2	Smilegate	Smilegate	Microsoft Windows	
TBA	Crossfire	That's No Moon	Smilegate	Windows, PlayStation 5, Xbox Series X/S	
