= Remedy Entertainment =

Finnish video game developer

Remedy Entertainment Plc
- Logo since April 2023
- Native name: Remedy Entertainment Oyj
- Formerly: Remedy Entertainment Oy (1995–2017)
- Type: Public
- Traded as: Nasdaq Helsinki: REMEDY
- ISIN: FI4000251897
- Industry: Video games
- Founded: 18 August 1995; 31 years ago
- Founders: Samuli Syvähuoko; Markus Mäki; Sami Nopanen; John Kavaleff; Sami Vanhatalo
- Headquarters: Espoo, Finland
- Key people: Markus Mäki (chairman and CEO); Sam Lake (creative director)
- Products: Max Payne; Alan Wake; Quantum Break; Control
- Revenue: ▲€59.5 million (2025)
- Net income: ▼ −€13.0 million (2025)
- Owner: Markus Mäki (23.44%); Skandinaviska Enskilda Banken Ab (16.31%); Citibanken Europe Plc (15.29%); Sam Lake (4.11%); Tero Virtala (2.14%); (as of 31 May 2026)
- Number of employees: ▼378 (2026)
- Website: remedygames.com

Remedy Entertainment Oyj, trading internationally as Remedy Entertainment Plc, is a Finnish video game developer based in Espoo. Notable games the studio has developed include the first two entries in the Max Payne franchise, Alan Wake, Quantum Break, and Control. Sam Lake, Remedy's creative director, has represented the company on numerous occasions.

Founded in August 1995 by members of demoscene group Future Crew, Remedy Entertainment created its first game, Death Rally, in a team member's basement. Apogee Software served as the game's publisher, and continued to be involved in the production of its next title, Max Payne, which received critical acclaim upon release. The game was followed by a sequel, Max Payne 2: The Fall of Max Payne, released by Rockstar Games. After spending seven years working on the Max Payne franchise, the developer decided to create a new intellectual property called Alan Wake. This title was once suspected to be vaporware because of the length of time it took to produce and release. It gained a cult following when it was released in 2010, by Microsoft Game Studios, though at the time its sales were not enough to justify the production of a sequel. Remedy decided to pursue a new project named Quantum Break, which further expanded the live-action component of Alan Wake. The team had transitioned to become a multi-project studio since 2016, and had three projects in development, including Control and the single-player portions of CrossfireX. FBC: Firebreak, was released on 17 June 2025. In September 2026 Remedy released Control Resonant. They are currently developing remakes of their original Max Payne titles.

Remedy Entertainment has specialised in making cinematic single-player action games featuring a strong central character. With its roots in the demo scene Remedy have a strong history in developing its own game engines for its titles, most notably Northlight for Quantum Break. The studio underwent rapid expansion during the 2010s. It became a public company in 2017, and moved into a larger office in Espoo in 2018. Remedy opened its second studio in Stockholm in 2022.

== History ==
=== Background and founding (1995–1998) ===
Remedy's original logo, designed by Henri Loikkanen, was introduced in July 1996. Its resemblance to the LucasArts logo prompted LucasArts to threaten with legal action, resulting in its removal in July 1998.

The company was founded by members of different demoscene groups that worked on creating demos for personal computers (PCs) and Commodore International's Amiga PCs. In 1994, inspired by Bloodhouse and Terramarque, Finland's first commercial video game developers, members of the Future Crew demogroup realised that their group would not evolve into a commercial developer by itself, and they would have to set up a new company. They decided to found the company they called Remedy to produce video games and began recruiting other like-minded individuals with a demoscene background. Remedy's founding members were Samuli Syvähuoko, Markus Mäki, Sami Nopanen, John Kavaleff and Sami Vanhatalo. The company was officially established on 18 August 1995. At the time the company was founded, most members were only in their early twenties. They produced their first video game in the basement of Syvähuoko's parents' house in Espoo's Westend district.

The team began developing a racing game, initially known as HiSpeed, based on the first idea the team pitched. Scott Miller, the founder of Apogee Software, provided creative input and suggested the racing game should introduce vehicular combat elements. Renamed Death Rally, Apogee Software released the game in 1996. Needing dialog for the game, Remedy's Petri Järvilehto contacted a long-time friend Sam Lake, who was studying English literature at University of Helsinki at the time, to help; Lake subsequently remained at Remedy and would eventually become the studio's creative director.

In 1997, Remedy also created a benchmarking tool, Final Reality, with the team later spinning off as a new sister company, Futuremark. In a letter dated 9 July 1998, LucasArts, through attorney John Sullivan, approached Remedy and threatened legal action, claiming the Remedy logo was copied from the top part of LucasArts' logo. By that time, Remedy had already been in the process of redesigning its logo, as its logo at the time did not properly reflect Remedy as a company. The old logo was taken off Remedy's website in July, and was replaced by a question mark. The new logo, designed by Kiia Kallio, was unveiled on 29 April 1999.

=== Max Payne series (1999–2005) ===
Logo between April 1999 and April 2023, designed by Kiia Kallio

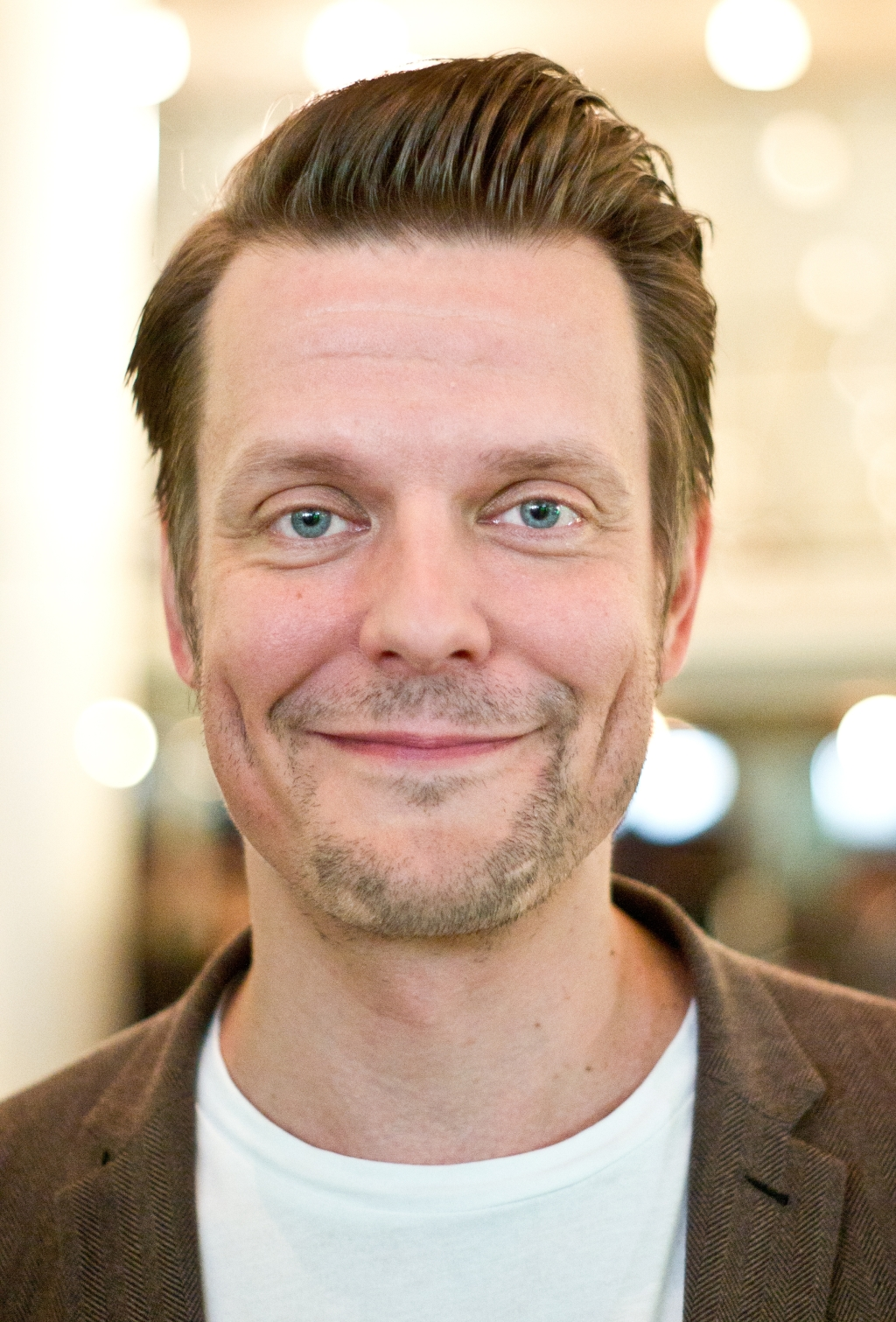
Sam Lake was the writer and the face model for Max Payne in the original game, and has since represented Remedy on numerous occasions.

Following the release of Death Rally, Remedy began pitching its next project to Miller. One was a space flight simulation game like Descent: FreeSpace, one was a racing game, while another was an isometric shooter named Dark Justice. Miller decided to fund the shooter's development, on the condition the game had a strong central character like Duke Nukem, 3D graphics, and a better name. He felt Dark Justice was too "dark" and "adult". The team proposed different possibilities, ranging from "Dick Justice" to "Max Heat", a name the company trademarked for $20,000, before settling on the name "Max Payne". The game's lead designer was Petri Järvilehto. He wanted bullet time and slow motion, a hallmark of Hong Kong action films, to be the core mechanic for their game. They decided to position it as a resource for players to use. With an expertise in computing because of their demoscene background, the team crafted their own game engine for the game. Sam Lake was appointed as the game's writer. He introduced elements commonly found in crime fiction and film noir into the game. The team wanted to use real-life photos for the game's texture, though this was initially met with heavy resistance by the artists. In 1999, the designers travelled from Finland to New York to research the city and get ideas for environments. Accompanied by two former New York Police Department bodyguards, they took thousands of photographs for mapping. The company spent most of its time in 2000 further refining the game's graphics. Having delayed its release twice, Max Payne received critical acclaim when it was released in July 2001. It was noted for its heavy focus on story and atmosphere as an action game, which was traditionally more gameplay oriented. The game was a commercial success, selling more than seven million copies.

Apogee outsourced the development of Max Payne's console versions to Rockstar Games, whose parent company Take-Two Interactive spent $10 million to purchase the intellectual property rights to the franchise; Rockstar still holds the rights to Max Payne as of 2021. As part of the acquisition agreement, Remedy would return to develop a sequel for the game. Take-Two gave Remedy plenty of creative freedom. The development cycle for the sequel game was much shorter than the original. The team made use of most of the existing gameplay mechanics and expanded them. Lake returned to write the game's script. He went to the Theatre Academy of Finland to study screenwriting to be able to write a more "ambitious" story. Lake's script had more than 600 pages, five times that of the original. Max Payne 2: The Fall of Max Payne received critical acclaim when it was released in October 2003, 27 months after Max Payne's release. However, it sold poorly. Take-Two cited the game's "continued disappointing sales" as one of the reasons for the company's forecast of a drop in sales revenue for 2004. Remedy was no longer involved with the franchise after Max Payne 2, but Rockstar consulted it when Max Payne 3 reached its final stage of production.

=== Partnership with Microsoft (2006–2016) ===
After working for seven years on the Max Payne series, the team wanted to develop something new. They began prototyping and experimenting with different gameplay mechanics with the intention of making a sandbox game. However, due to limited resources, the team found that developing an open world was not feasible and decided to refocus the game as a linear experience. The company was inspired by Stephen King's novels, Twin Peaks, ghost towns in the American Northwest, and tornado patterns, and they invited a landscape architect to serve as the game's consultant. The team organised a field trip to the Northwest and Crater Lake and took more than 40,000 photographs for use creating the game's environment. The game was in pre-production for more than three years, while full development only lasted for approximately two years. During this period, the studio increased the number of employees from 30 to 45. Some media outlets suspected the game had become vapourware as it disappeared from the public spotlight for a considerable time after its announcement. Microsoft Game Studios acted as the game's publisher after securing an exclusivity deal with Remedy. The title, Alan Wake, was released for Microsoft's Xbox 360 to generally positive reviews in May 2010. Remedy pushed for a PC version after the game's launch, and Microsoft greenlit its production in mid-2011. The PC version, developed with Nitro Games, was released in February 2012. The game sold more than 3.2 million copies, but Remedy explained in 2013 that it was not financially successful enough for them to raise the funds needed to continue developing a sequel. Unlike Max Payne, Alan Wake's narrative was written to accommodate the release of multiple sequels. The company began developing different prototypes for Alan Wake 2. Some of its elements were reintegrated into Alan Wake's American Nightmare, a 2012 standalone Xbox Live Arcade game which had a much shorter development cycle. Collectively, both games sold more than 4.5 million copies as of March 2015.

The company showed the prototype it had developed for Alan Wake 2 to different publishers. Microsoft was not interested in pursuing a sequel to Alan Wake, but they were keen on working with Remedy again on an original intellectual property. The company had experimented with transmedia storytelling in Alan Wake, and Microsoft hoped Remedy would further expand the live-action component in their next project, Quantum Break. Pre-production of the game began in 2011; approximately 100 people worked on it with Sam Lake now positioned as Remedy's creative director. The idea of quantum physics originated with Alan Wake's TV show called Quantum Suicide. The team thought time travel was the best way to accommodate the storytelling structure. Described as a "transmedia action-shooter video game and television hybrid", Lake directed the game, while Lifeboat Productions produced the TV component, with Ben Ketai as director. The company built a new game engine for the game known as Northlight. Quantum Break received generally positive reviews from critics when it was released in 2016. Microsoft declared it the best-selling original property released by the firm since the release of the Xbox One. As of 2021, the rights to Quantum Break remain with Microsoft.

During this period, Remedy began experimenting with mobile games. The studio began developing a remake of Death Rally for iOS and Android. The game took eight months to develop, and it was a collaborative effort between Remedy, Mountain Sheep and Cornfox & Brothers. Remedy spent only $10,000 marketing the game, but it proved to be a commercial success for them. More than 11 million players downloaded the game and the development team recouped their budget in three days. Seeing the success of Death Rally, Lake claimed it was only the company's "first step" into the mobile gaming space and they were looking at creating more titles for mobile platforms. In 2013, Remedy expanded its board of directors, adding Mike Capps, former president of Epic Games, and Christian Fredriksson, chief executive of security firm F-Secure to the board. In late 2013, the company announced its next mobile game, Agents of Storm, a tower defence game for iOS. They collaborated with German publisher Flaregames on the project, which was released in late 2014.

=== Diversifying portfolio (2016–present) ===
Remedy underwent several management changes from 2015 to 2016. Chief executive officer (CEO) Matias Myllyrinne left Remedy to join Wargaming, with former CEO of RedLynx, Tero Virtala, replacing him and the interim CEO Markus Mäki. Virtala's appointment was made to help Remedy transition into a multi-project studio, so that each game would have a shorter development cycle. In 2017, Remedy launched an initial public offering to raise funds to develop projects concurrently, and became a public company listed on the NASDAQ First North Finland exchange. The company announced it was working on the single-player component of Smilegate's free-to-play first-person shooter Crossfire 2 (later renamed as CrossfireX). Its predecessor, Crossfire, was one of the highest-grossing video games of all time by 2016. Remedy is also working on a new version of the original Crossfire, called Crossfire HD. After the announcement, Remedy began teasing its next project, codenamed P7. 505 Games provided support in marketing and publishing in addition to a fund of €7.75 million to assist in the game's development. The game, titled Control, was released for PlayStation 4, Windows, and Xbox One on 27 August 2019, and was the first game developed by Remedy for a Sony platform since Max Payne 2. Control sold over two million units by March 2021 and won several gaming awards, and has since had ports to the Nintendo Switch (via cloud streaming).

An unnamed third project has also been in development in tandem with CrossfireX and Control. A small 15-person team dedicated to creating multiplayer and live titles known as "Vanguard", was established in 2018.

A television show based on Alan Wake was announced in September 2018 with Lake attached as its executive producer. Remedy fully acquired the publishing rights to Alan Wake in July 2019 from Microsoft, including a one-time €2.5 million royalty payment from the series' performance.

In March 2020, Remedy and Epic Games announced that they had established a two-game publishing deal with plans for release in the next few years, both within the same franchise. One was a larger, AAA-style game that was already in pre-production. while the second was a smaller-scale project yet to be started. Under the terms of the deal, Remedy would retain full creative control of the development process and intellectual property, while Epic will fully back development costs; following release, once Epic has recouped its backing Epic and Remedy will split profits 50/50. The larger game is part of Remedy's "shared universe" between Alan Wake and Control. Lake said it has had the idea of developing for ten years, even as far back with Max Payne references within Alan Wake, and Quantum Break teasing elements of Alan Wake. The smaller title was Alan Wake Remastered, released in October 2021; the larger title, Alan Wake 2, entered full production in Aug 2021 and was released in October 2023.

In May 2021, it was announced that Tencent acquired a minority stake of 3.8% in the company from sales of shares from Accendo Capital, which still otherwise held 14% ownership in Remedy. Remedy and Tencent announced in December 2021 that Remedy was working on a new online game to be published by Tencent under the code name Vanguard. While Vanguard was originally planned as a free-to-play title, Remedy announced in November 2023 that it shifted the game to be a premium-price title, and was now developing it under the codename Kestrel. However, by May 2024, Remedy and Tencent agreed to cancel further development of Kestrel in favor of Remedy focusing on its existing IP.

Remedy announced plans to open a new studio in Sweden in the first half of 2022, as based on its experience from working during the COVID-19 pandemic, it found a need for a hybrid work model for its Sweden-based staff.

In April 2022, Remedy announced that with funding from Rockstar Games, it was remaking Max Payne and Max Payne 2 in the Northlight engine for PlayStation 5, Windows, and Xbox Series X/S.

In February 2024, Remedy purchased all rights for Control from 505 Games for €17 million. In May, it was announced that CFO Terhi Kauppi would be leaving the company at the end of the following month.

In August 2024, Remedy announced a "strategic cooperation agreement" with Annapurna Pictures which brings Annapurna in to co-finance Control 2, covering 50% of the development costs, and provides options for film and television projects involving Alan Wake and Control. The following month, Tencent agreed to give the company a €15 million convertible loan, pending approval, which could ultimately be converted into around 6% of the company, thus increasing Tencent's stake to 20%.

By June 2025, Remedy had increased its headcount by 6.6% to 385 employees. That month, the studio released FBC: Firebreak, a multi-player standalone game based on Control. The game failed to meet sales expectations, leading to Remedy anticipating negative profit for the year. CEO Tero Virtala voluntarily stepped down from the role in October 2025.

== Games developed ==
Year	Title	Platform(s)	Publisher(s)	Notes
1996	Death Rally	MS-DOS, Windows	Apogee Software, Remedy Entertainment	
2001	Max Payne	Windows, PlayStation 2, Xbox, Game Boy Advance, Android, iOS	Gathering of Developers, Rockstar Games	Game Boy Advance version developed by Möbius Entertainment
2003	Max Payne 2: The Fall of Max Payne	Windows, PlayStation 2, Xbox	Rockstar Games	
2010	Alan Wake	Xbox 360, Windows	Microsoft Game Studios, Remedy Entertainment	Windows version published by Remedy Entertainment
2011	Death Rally	Windows, Android, iOS, Fire OS	Remedy Entertainment	Co-developed by Cornfox & Bros. and Mountain Sheep
2012	Alan Wake's American Nightmare	Windows, Xbox 360	Microsoft Studios, Remedy Entertainment	Windows version published by Remedy Entertainment
2014	Agents of Storm	iOS	Flaregames	
2016	Quantum Break	Windows, Xbox One	Microsoft Studios	Additional work by Asobo Studio
2019	Control	Windows, PlayStation 4, Xbox One, Nintendo Switch, Stadia, PlayStation 5, Xbox Series X/S, macOS	505 Games, Remedy Entertainment	Remedy Entertainment took over publishing in 2025
2021	Alan Wake Remastered	Windows, PlayStation 4, Xbox One, PlayStation 5, Xbox Series X/S, Nintendo Switch	Epic Games Publishing	Co-developed by D3T
2022	CrossfireX / Crossfire HD (single-player)	Xbox One, Xbox Series X/S	Smilegate Entertainment	Co-developed by Smilegate Entertainment
2023	Alan Wake 2	Windows, PlayStation 5, Xbox Series X/S	Epic Games Publishing	
2025	FBC: Firebreak	Windows, PlayStation 5, Xbox Series X/S	Remedy Entertainment	
2026	Control Resonant	macOS, Windows, PlayStation 5, Xbox Series X/S	Remedy Entertainment	Co-financed by Annapurna Pictures
TBA	Max Payne and Max Payne 2 remakes	Windows, PlayStation 5, Xbox Series X/S	Rockstar Games	

Canceled games

Title	Platform(s)	Publisher(s)	Ref.
Kestrel (working title, formerly Vanguard)	PC, consoles	Remedy Entertainment, Tencent	

=== Northlight Engine ===
In addition to its games, Remedy developed Northlight Storytelling Engine, a multi-platform game engine which was first used in Quantum Break. According to Lake, it had considered narrative elements to be key to its prior games of Max Payne and Alan Wake, but felt it was necessary to develop its own technology to better support this facet. Part of this decision came about when Remedy had been working on the cancelled Alan Wake 2 prototype around 2013, at the time based on the same engine used in Alan Wake which had limited their abilities for storytelling. Building on the tech created for Alan Wake 2, Remedy fleshed out various features that support the studio's narrative goals such as highly detailed and realistic human faces and bodies that can be animated through motion capture and a physically based renderer that supports global illumination, ray tracing and particle lighting. A real-time deterministic physics system that can calculate environmental physics effects, play them back in real-time or rewind to create large scale interactive destruction was also used.

== Facilities ==
The team used a basement in the Westend district of Espoo, Finland, as a workspace for the production of its first games. According to Lake, there were mattresses strewn across the basement floor because team members sometimes slept there. Before 2018, Remedy was using a four-story office in Espoo which offered various facilities including a café, a sauna, a bar and a gym. It also had a "development warehouse", which housed many items once used by the studio such as photos and graphic novels (for Max Payne) and clothes (for Alan Wake), as well as old computers, design documents, demo video tapes, and early scripts. As the studio underwent significant expansion, it relocated to a newer and bigger office, also in Espoo, in May 2018. The new office allows Remedy to accommodate a motion capture studio floor that is four times larger than the original.

As of December 2019, Remedy has more than 250 employees from 30 different countries.

== Culture and philosophy ==
The studio has specialised in making cinematic single-player action games. According to managing director Matias Myllyrinne, the studio's games always have a strong lead character (as evidenced by Max Payne and Alan Wake), and its games must be "approachable" and relatable and appeal to the largest possible audience. The team hoped players would be immersed fully in the world they created. He added that themes like "World War II, dragons, hardcore sci-fi, or women with tight leather outfits" are something the studio would avoid. The team also aimed for "movie realism", where real-world believability was important. However, the team usually took inspiration from movies, TV shows and books rather than video games as they wanted to create something unique for the video game industry. When they were developing games, they always began by creating the story, which informed and guided other aspects of development such as gameplay. Most of the company's games are linear, but Remedy began exploring ideas like multiplayer gaming and open-ended gameplay around 2015. The studio typically used their own in-house technology, including the Northlight Engine, to power their game, and invested a lot in motion capture. It partnered with Nvidia to streamline the motion capture process.

Starting from 2016, the company began to transform itself into a multi-project studio, with each title having a shorter development cycle. This enabled the team to become more financially secure and allowed team members to choose which projects they wanted to work on. The team also began taking on work-for-hire projects; Remedy developed the single-player portion of CrossfireX. This is part of a strategy adopted by Remedy to expand into new genres and boost its popularity in different parts of the world. Although the company plans to release games more frequently, Virtala insisted that game quality would not be compromised and that a Remedy game launch would still be "rare".

== Recognition ==
GamesIndustry.biz named Remedy one of its 2019 People of the Year in its successful launch of Control, its first title after its IPO. Also Hideo Kojima, known as the father of the Metal Gear series, has expressed that he is a huge fan of Control, and visited Remedy's studio during his visit to Finland in 2019.
